This is a partial list of unnumbered minor planets for principal provisional designations assigned during 16–31 October 2003. Since this period yielded a high number of provisional discoveries, it is further split into several standalone pages. , a total of 478 bodies remain unnumbered for this period. Objects for this year are listed on the following pages: A–E · F–G · H–L · M–R · Si · Sii · Siii · Siv · T · Ui · Uii · Uiii · Uiv · V · Wi · Wii and X–Y. Also see previous and next year.

U 

|- id="2003 UC291" bgcolor=#fefefe
| 0 ||  || MBA-I || 18.1 || data-sort-value="0.71" | 710 m || multiple || 1996–2020 || 14 Jul 2020 || 105 || align=left | Alt.: 1996 VU21, 2015 AR200 || 
|- id="2003 UM291" bgcolor=#d6d6d6
| 0 ||  || MBA-O || 16.8 || 2.4 km || multiple || 2003–2020 || 19 Jan 2020 || 84 || align=left | — || 
|- id="2003 US291" bgcolor=#C2E0FF
| E ||  || TNO || 7.1 || 158 km || single || 33 days || 24 Nov 2003 || 6 || align=left | LoUTNOs, other TNO || 
|- id="2003 UT291" bgcolor=#C2E0FF
| 3 ||  || TNO || 6.4 || 174 km || multiple || 2003–2013 || 07 Oct 2013 || 15 || align=left | LoUTNOs, cubewano (cold) || 
|- id="2003 UV291" bgcolor=#C2E0FF
| 2 ||  || TNO || 7.3 || 115 km || multiple || 2003–2017 || 23 Sep 2017 || 42 || align=left | LoUTNOs, cubewano (cold) || 
|- id="2003 UW291" bgcolor=#C2E0FF
| E ||  || TNO || 6.3 || 189 km || single || 28 days || 20 Nov 2003 || 4 || align=left | LoUTNOs, cubewano? || 
|- id="2003 UX291" bgcolor=#C2E0FF
| E ||  || TNO || 7.0 || 137 km || single || 28 days || 20 Nov 2003 || 4 || align=left | LoUTNOs, cubewano? || 
|- id="2003 UY291" bgcolor=#C2E0FF
| 4 ||  || TNO || 7.21 || 120 km || multiple || 2003–2021 || 11 Jan 2021 || 17 || align=left | LoUTNOs, cubewano (cold), BR-mag: 1.39; taxonomy: BB || 
|- id="2003 UZ291" bgcolor=#C2E0FF
| 4 ||  || TNO || 7.09 || 196 km || multiple || 2003–2021 || 05 Nov 2021 || 23 || align=left | LoUTNOs, cubewano (hot) || 
|- id="2003 UA292" bgcolor=#C2E0FF
| E ||  || TNO || 6.1 || 207 km || single || 29 days || 20 Nov 2003 || 4 || align=left | LoUTNOs, cubewano? || 
|- id="2003 UB292" bgcolor=#C2E0FF
| 3 ||  || TNO || 5.88 || 277 km || multiple || 2003–2021 || 03 Oct 2021 || 30 || align=left | LoUTNOs, other TNO || 
|- id="2003 UC292" bgcolor=#C2E0FF
| E ||  || TNO || 6.9 || 143 km || single || 28 days || 20 Nov 2003 || 4 || align=left | LoUTNOs, cubewano? || 
|- id="2003 UD292" bgcolor=#C2E0FF
| E ||  || TNO || 6.6 || 164 km || single || 29 days || 21 Nov 2003 || 4 || align=left | LoUTNOs, cubewano? || 
|- id="2003 UE292" bgcolor=#C2E0FF
| E ||  || TNO || 6.7 || 190 km || single || 29 days || 21 Nov 2003 || 4 || align=left | LoUTNOs, other TNO || 
|- id="2003 UF292" bgcolor=#C2E0FF
| E ||  || TNO || 7.3 || 144 km || single || 28 days || 20 Nov 2003 || 4 || align=left | LoUTNOs, other TNO || 
|- id="2003 UG292" bgcolor=#C2E0FF
| – ||  || TNO || 7.0 || 204 km || single || 59 days || 21 Dec 2003 || 7 || align=left | LoUTNOs, cubewano (hot) || 
|- id="2003 UH292" bgcolor=#C2E0FF
| E ||  || TNO || 7.7 || 99 km || single || 27 days || 20 Nov 2003 || 4 || align=left | LoUTNOs, cubewano? || 
|- id="2003 UK292" bgcolor=#C2E0FF
| E ||  || TNO || 7.2 || 125 km || single || 28 days || 21 Nov 2003 || 4 || align=left | LoUTNOs, cubewano? || 
|- id="2003 UL292" bgcolor=#C2E0FF
| E ||  || TNO || 7.3 || 119 km || single || 28 days || 21 Nov 2003 || 4 || align=left | LoUTNOs, cubewano? || 
|- id="2003 UM292" bgcolor=#C2E0FF
| E ||  || TNO || 7.0 || 166 km || single || 28 days || 21 Nov 2003 || 4 || align=left | LoUTNOs, other TNO || 
|- id="2003 UN292" bgcolor=#C2E0FF
| 3 ||  || TNO || 7.5 || 105 km || multiple || 2003–2016 || 04 Feb 2016 || 16 || align=left | LoUTNOs, cubewano (cold) || 
|- id="2003 UO292" bgcolor=#C2E0FF
| E ||  || TNO || 7.4 || 157 km || single || 30 days || 21 Nov 2003 || 4 || align=left | LoUTNOs, plutino? || 
|- id="2003 UP292" bgcolor=#C2E0FF
| 2 ||  || TNO || 7.29 || 126 km || multiple || 2003–2021 || 11 Jan 2021 || 102 || align=left | LoUTNOs, twotino || 
|- id="2003 UQ292" bgcolor=#C2E0FF
| E ||  || TNO || 7.0 || 188 km || single || 32 days || 24 Nov 2003 || 4 || align=left | LoUTNOs, plutino? || 
|- id="2003 UT292" bgcolor=#C2E0FF
| 1 ||  || TNO || 7.1 || 186 km || multiple || 2003–2020 || 23 Mar 2020 || 85 || align=left | LoUTNOs, plutino, albedo: 0.067 || 
|- id="2003 UU292" bgcolor=#C2E0FF
| E ||  || TNO || 8.2 || 108 km || single || 28 days || 21 Nov 2003 || 4 || align=left | LoUTNOs, plutino? || 
|- id="2003 UV292" bgcolor=#C2E0FF
| 4 ||  || TNO || 7.39 || 157 km || multiple || 2003–2021 || 01 Dec 2021 || 21 || align=left | LoUTNOs, plutino || 
|- id="2003 UX292" bgcolor=#C2E0FF
| E ||  || TNO || 6.6 || 164 km || single || 28 days || 20 Nov 2003 || 4 || align=left | LoUTNOs, cubewano? || 
|- id="2003 UY292" bgcolor=#C7FF8F
| E ||  || CEN || 10.2 || 51 km || single || 29 days || 21 Nov 2003 || 4 || align=left | — || 
|- id="2003 UZ292" bgcolor=#C2E0FF
| E ||  || TNO || 7.7 || 120 km || single || 28 days || 21 Nov 2003 || 4 || align=left | LoUTNOs, other TNO || 
|- id="2003 UK293" bgcolor=#C2E0FF
| 2 ||  || TNO || 7.4 || 110 km || multiple || 2003–2017 || 16 Dec 2017 || 44 || align=left | LoUTNOs, cubewano (cold) || 
|- id="2003 UQ294" bgcolor=#E9E9E9
| 0 ||  || MBA-M || 17.6 || 1.3 km || multiple || 2003–2020 || 11 Sep 2020 || 51 || align=left | Disc.: SpacewatchAdded on 19 October 2020 || 
|- id="2003 UT294" bgcolor=#d6d6d6
| 0 ||  || MBA-O || 16.8 || 2.4 km || multiple || 1997–2020 || 24 Oct 2020 || 50 || align=left | Disc.: SpacewatchAdded on 17 January 2021Alt.: 1997 SL29 || 
|- id="2003 UU294" bgcolor=#fefefe
| 1 ||  || MBA-I || 19.1 || data-sort-value="0.45" | 450 m || multiple || 2003–2020 || 23 Nov 2020 || 26 || align=left | — || 
|- id="2003 UX294" bgcolor=#d6d6d6
| 0 ||  || MBA-O || 16.44 || 2.9 km || multiple || 2003–2021 || 14 Apr 2021 || 107 || align=left | Alt.: 2011 GM7, 2015 AE22 || 
|- id="2003 UG295" bgcolor=#fefefe
| 0 ||  || MBA-I || 17.8 || data-sort-value="0.82" | 820 m || multiple || 1999–2020 || 16 Mar 2020 || 95 || align=left | Alt.: 2016 BY25 || 
|- id="2003 UV295" bgcolor=#fefefe
| 3 ||  || MBA-I || 19.6 || data-sort-value="0.36" | 360 m || multiple || 2003–2017 || 23 Sep 2017 || 19 || align=left | — || 
|- id="2003 UX295" bgcolor=#E9E9E9
| 1 ||  || MBA-M || 19.2 || data-sort-value="0.61" | 610 m || multiple || 2003–2020 || 12 Dec 2020 || 56 || align=left | Disc.: SpacewatchAdded on 17 January 2021 || 
|- id="2003 UY295" bgcolor=#E9E9E9
| 0 ||  || MBA-M || 17.42 || 1.4 km || multiple || 2003–2022 || 27 Jan 2022 || 103 || align=left | Alt.: 2007 TX408 || 
|- id="2003 UF296" bgcolor=#E9E9E9
| 0 ||  || MBA-M || 17.7 || 1.2 km || multiple || 2003–2020 || 05 Nov 2020 || 84 || align=left | Alt.: 2016 US52 || 
|- id="2003 UP296" bgcolor=#d6d6d6
| 0 ||  || MBA-O || 17.15 || 2.1 km || multiple || 2003–2021 || 30 Dec 2021 || 48 || align=left | Disc.: SpacewatchAdded on 17 June 2021 || 
|- id="2003 UG297" bgcolor=#fefefe
| 0 ||  || MBA-I || 18.1 || data-sort-value="0.71" | 710 m || multiple || 2003–2019 || 24 Nov 2019 || 44 || align=left | — || 
|- id="2003 UJ297" bgcolor=#d6d6d6
| 0 ||  || HIL || 15.6 || 4.2 km || multiple || 2003–2021 || 15 Jan 2021 || 102 || align=left | — || 
|- id="2003 UT297" bgcolor=#d6d6d6
| 0 ||  || MBA-O || 15.97 || 3.6 km || multiple || 2003–2022 || 27 Jan 2022 || 156 || align=left | — || 
|- id="2003 UV297" bgcolor=#fefefe
| 3 ||  || MBA-I || 18.9 || data-sort-value="0.49" | 490 m || multiple || 2003–2020 || 14 Dec 2020 || 24 || align=left | Disc.: SpacewatchAdded on 17 June 2021 || 
|- id="2003 UZ297" bgcolor=#d6d6d6
| 0 ||  || HIL || 16.3 || 3.1 km || multiple || 2003–2020 || 19 Jan 2020 || 74 || align=left | — || 
|- id="2003 UJ298" bgcolor=#fefefe
| 1 ||  || MBA-I || 19.16 || data-sort-value="0.44" | 440 m || multiple || 2003–2021 || 30 Oct 2021 || 37 || align=left | Disc.: SpacewatchAdded on 5 November 2021Alt.: 2014 WB225 || 
|- id="2003 UB299" bgcolor=#fefefe
| 1 ||  || MBA-I || 19.33 || data-sort-value="0.40" | 400 m || multiple || 2003–2022 || 07 Jan 2022 || 38 || align=left | — || 
|- id="2003 UE299" bgcolor=#d6d6d6
| 0 ||  || MBA-O || 16.4 || 2.9 km || multiple || 2003–2021 || 03 Jan 2021 || 114 || align=left | Alt.: 2014 WY163 || 
|- id="2003 UE300" bgcolor=#fefefe
| 0 ||  || MBA-I || 18.9 || data-sort-value="0.49" | 490 m || multiple || 1992–2018 || 13 Dec 2018 || 46 || align=left | Alt.: 2014 QH239 || 
|- id="2003 UN300" bgcolor=#E9E9E9
| 1 ||  || MBA-M || 18.1 || 1.0 km || multiple || 2003–2020 || 12 Sep 2020 || 39 || align=left | — || 
|- id="2003 UB301" bgcolor=#fefefe
| 0 ||  || MBA-I || 18.27 || data-sort-value="0.66" | 660 m || multiple || 2003–2021 || 28 Nov 2021 || 105 || align=left | Alt.: 2010 RF57, 2017 ON3 || 
|- id="2003 UH301" bgcolor=#E9E9E9
| 0 ||  || MBA-M || 17.50 || 1.8 km || multiple || 2003–2021 || 07 Nov 2021 || 80 || align=left | Disc.: SpacewatchAdded on 30 September 2021Alt.: 2012 TQ300 || 
|- id="2003 UR301" bgcolor=#E9E9E9
| 1 ||  || MBA-M || 18.76 || data-sort-value="0.99" | 990 m || multiple || 2003–2021 || 29 Nov 2021 || 67 || align=left | Disc.: SpacewatchAdded on 5 November 2021 || 
|- id="2003 UU301" bgcolor=#fefefe
| 0 ||  || MBA-I || 18.91 || data-sort-value="0.49" | 490 m || multiple || 2003–2021 || 08 Dec 2021 || 41 || align=left | — || 
|- id="2003 UA302" bgcolor=#fefefe
| 1 ||  || MBA-I || 18.6 || data-sort-value="0.57" | 570 m || multiple || 1999–2020 || 16 Feb 2020 || 47 || align=left | — || 
|- id="2003 UE302" bgcolor=#E9E9E9
| 0 ||  || MBA-M || 17.94 || 1.1 km || multiple || 2003–2022 || 25 Jan 2022 || 200 || align=left | — || 
|- id="2003 UF302" bgcolor=#E9E9E9
| 1 ||  || MBA-M || 18.3 || 1.2 km || multiple || 2003–2019 || 28 Feb 2019 || 35 || align=left | — || 
|- id="2003 UH302" bgcolor=#E9E9E9
| 0 ||  || MBA-M || 17.8 || data-sort-value="0.82" | 820 m || multiple || 2003–2021 || 04 Jan 2021 || 38 || align=left | — || 
|- id="2003 UM302" bgcolor=#E9E9E9
| 0 ||  || MBA-M || 17.5 || 1.3 km || multiple || 2003–2021 || 14 Jan 2021 || 168 || align=left | — || 
|- id="2003 UW302" bgcolor=#d6d6d6
| 3 ||  || MBA-O || 18.4 || 1.2 km || multiple || 2003–2019 || 01 Nov 2019 || 22 || align=left | Disc.: SpacewatchAdded on 17 June 2021Alt.: 2019 QD66 || 
|- id="2003 UY302" bgcolor=#E9E9E9
| 0 ||  || MBA-M || 17.9 || data-sort-value="0.78" | 780 m || multiple || 2003–2020 || 16 Dec 2020 || 46 || align=left | Disc.: SpacewatchAdded on 9 March 2021 || 
|- id="2003 UC303" bgcolor=#E9E9E9
| 1 ||  || MBA-M || 18.3 || data-sort-value="0.65" | 650 m || multiple || 2003–2019 || 02 Oct 2019 || 64 || align=left | Disc.: SpacewatchAdded on 22 July 2020Alt.: 2015 SN12 || 
|- id="2003 UD303" bgcolor=#d6d6d6
| 1 ||  || MBA-O || 17.9 || 1.5 km || multiple || 2003–2020 || 14 Nov 2020 || 42 || align=left | Alt.: 2014 SW6 || 
|- id="2003 UH303" bgcolor=#E9E9E9
| 0 ||  || MBA-M || 17.04 || 2.2 km || multiple || 2003–2021 || 05 Jul 2021 || 117 || align=left | — || 
|- id="2003 UV303" bgcolor=#d6d6d6
| 0 ||  || MBA-O || 17.5 || 1.8 km || multiple || 2003–2021 || 07 Feb 2021 || 46 || align=left | Disc.: SpacewatchAdded on 11 May 2021Alt.: 2014 XA15 || 
|- id="2003 UF304" bgcolor=#E9E9E9
| 4 ||  || MBA-M || 18.1 || data-sort-value="0.71" | 710 m || multiple || 2003–2007 || 09 Oct 2007 || 24 || align=left | Alt.: 2007 TJ75 || 
|- id="2003 UG304" bgcolor=#d6d6d6
| 0 ||  || MBA-O || 17.0 || 2.2 km || multiple || 2001–2020 || 19 Jan 2020 || 67 || align=left | Alt.: 2008 RT79 || 
|- id="2003 UR304" bgcolor=#E9E9E9
| 1 ||  || MBA-M || 18.28 || 1.2 km || multiple || 2003–2021 || 09 Oct 2021 || 46 || align=left | Disc.: SpacewatchAdded on 30 September 2021Alt.: 2021 PH71 || 
|- id="2003 US304" bgcolor=#d6d6d6
| 0 ||  || MBA-O || 16.4 || 2.9 km || multiple || 2003–2021 || 14 Apr 2021 || 57 || align=left | — || 
|- id="2003 UW304" bgcolor=#d6d6d6
| 0 ||  || MBA-O || 16.8 || 2.4 km || multiple || 2003–2019 || 05 Nov 2019 || 70 || align=left | — || 
|- id="2003 UG305" bgcolor=#d6d6d6
| 0 ||  || MBA-O || 16.7 || 2.5 km || multiple || 2003–2021 || 14 Jan 2021 || 89 || align=left | Alt.: 2015 AP246 || 
|- id="2003 UL305" bgcolor=#E9E9E9
| 3 ||  || MBA-M || 19.0 || data-sort-value="0.67" | 670 m || multiple || 2003–2020 || 10 Dec 2020 || 22 || align=left | Disc.: SpacewatchAdded on 17 June 2021Alt.: 2020 WH11 || 
|- id="2003 UM305" bgcolor=#fefefe
| 5 ||  || MBA-I || 19.1 || data-sort-value="0.45" | 450 m || multiple || 2003–2013 || 27 Oct 2013 || 13 || align=left | — || 
|- id="2003 UT305" bgcolor=#d6d6d6
| 0 ||  || HIL || 16.2 || 3.2 km || multiple || 2003–2021 || 06 Jan 2021 || 48 || align=left | — || 
|- id="2003 UX305" bgcolor=#fefefe
| 0 ||  || MBA-I || 17.80 || data-sort-value="0.82" | 820 m || multiple || 2003–2021 || 08 Nov 2021 || 110 || align=left | Alt.: 2010 RH135 || 
|- id="2003 UB306" bgcolor=#E9E9E9
| 0 ||  || MBA-M || 17.2 || 2.0 km || multiple || 1998–2020 || 27 Apr 2020 || 68 || align=left | — || 
|- id="2003 UH306" bgcolor=#E9E9E9
| 0 ||  || MBA-M || 18.4 || 1.2 km || multiple || 2003–2021 || 29 Nov 2021 || 41 || align=left | Disc.: SpacewatchAdded on 29 January 2022 || 
|- id="2003 UN306" bgcolor=#E9E9E9
| 3 ||  || MBA-M || 18.3 || data-sort-value="0.65" | 650 m || multiple || 2003–2019 || 29 Oct 2019 || 67 || align=left | Alt.: 2015 TT21 || 
|- id="2003 UQ306" bgcolor=#d6d6d6
| 0 ||  || MBA-O || 18.0 || 1.4 km || multiple || 2003–2020 || 09 Dec 2020 || 36 || align=left | Alt.: 2014 SG45 || 
|- id="2003 UK307" bgcolor=#E9E9E9
| 2 ||  || MBA-M || 18.60 || data-sort-value="0.80" | 800 m || multiple || 2003–2022 || 28 Jan 2022 || 27 || align=left | Disc.: SpacewatchAdded on 29 January 2022 || 
|- id="2003 UM307" bgcolor=#E9E9E9
| 0 ||  || MBA-M || 17.86 || 1.5 km || multiple || 2003–2021 || 30 Aug 2021 || 46 || align=left | — || 
|- id="2003 UT308" bgcolor=#fefefe
| 0 ||  || MBA-I || 18.76 || data-sort-value="0.53" | 530 m || multiple || 2003–2018 || 17 Nov 2018 || 48 || align=left | — || 
|- id="2003 UV308" bgcolor=#fefefe
| 2 ||  || MBA-I || 18.6 || data-sort-value="0.57" | 570 m || multiple || 2003–2018 || 10 Dec 2018 || 28 || align=left | Disc.: SpacewatchAdded on 29 January 2022 || 
|- id="2003 UQ309" bgcolor=#d6d6d6
| 0 ||  || MBA-O || 17.6 || 1.7 km || multiple || 2003–2021 || 15 Jan 2021 || 43 || align=left | — || 
|- id="2003 UW309" bgcolor=#d6d6d6
| 0 ||  || MBA-O || 15.9 || 3.7 km || multiple || 2000–2020 || 09 Dec 2020 || 202 || align=left | Alt.: 2014 QD88, 2015 XW381 || 
|- id="2003 UB310" bgcolor=#E9E9E9
| 1 ||  || MBA-M || 17.7 || 1.2 km || multiple || 2003–2021 || 05 Jan 2021 || 92 || align=left | Disc.: SpacewatchAdded on 17 January 2021 || 
|- id="2003 UE310" bgcolor=#d6d6d6
| 0 ||  || MBA-O || 15.9 || 3.7 km || multiple || 2003–2021 || 10 Jan 2021 || 191 || align=left | Alt.: 2014 WN145 || 
|- id="2003 UF310" bgcolor=#E9E9E9
| 1 ||  || MBA-M || 17.7 || data-sort-value="0.86" | 860 m || multiple || 2003–2020 || 21 Dec 2020 || 29 || align=left | — || 
|- id="2003 UO310" bgcolor=#fefefe
| 0 ||  || MBA-I || 18.64 || data-sort-value="0.56" | 560 m || multiple || 2003–2021 || 27 Dec 2021 || 43 || align=left | — || 
|- id="2003 UR310" bgcolor=#d6d6d6
| 0 ||  || MBA-O || 16.5 || 2.8 km || multiple || 2003–2021 || 16 Jan 2021 || 104 || align=left | — || 
|- id="2003 UH315" bgcolor=#E9E9E9
| – ||  || MBA-M || 19.3 || data-sort-value="0.41" | 410 m || single || 25 days || 24 Oct 2003 || 12 || align=left | — || 
|- id="2003 UJ315" bgcolor=#E9E9E9
| 1 ||  || MBA-M || 18.4 || data-sort-value="0.62" | 620 m || multiple || 2003–2019 || 03 Jun 2019 || 42 || align=left | — || 
|- id="2003 UW315" bgcolor=#d6d6d6
| 0 ||  || MBA-O || 15.9 || 3.7 km || multiple || 2000–2021 || 06 Jan 2021 || 141 || align=left | Alt.: 2010 BL101, 2017 FD113 || 
|- id="2003 UA316" bgcolor=#fefefe
| 0 ||  || MBA-I || 17.9 || data-sort-value="0.78" | 780 m || multiple || 2003–2020 || 20 Dec 2020 || 133 || align=left | — || 
|- id="2003 UA317" bgcolor=#d6d6d6
| 0 ||  || MBA-O || 17.1 || 2.1 km || multiple || 2003–2019 || 26 Sep 2019 || 82 || align=left | Alt.: 2014 UC64 || 
|- id="2003 UD317" bgcolor=#E9E9E9
| 0 ||  || MBA-M || 18.4 || data-sort-value="0.88" | 880 m || multiple || 2003–2020 || 11 Oct 2020 || 92 || align=left | — || 
|- id="2003 UQ317" bgcolor=#E9E9E9
| 0 ||  || MBA-M || 17.8 || 1.2 km || multiple || 2003–2020 || 15 Dec 2020 || 133 || align=left | — || 
|- id="2003 UB318" bgcolor=#E9E9E9
| 1 ||  || MBA-M || 18.6 || data-sort-value="0.57" | 570 m || multiple || 2003–2015 || 09 Sep 2015 || 24 || align=left | — || 
|- id="2003 UE318" bgcolor=#fefefe
| 0 ||  || MBA-I || 17.6 || data-sort-value="0.90" | 900 m || multiple || 2003–2021 || 07 Jan 2021 || 125 || align=left | — || 
|- id="2003 US319" bgcolor=#E9E9E9
| 0 ||  || MBA-M || 17.7 || data-sort-value="0.86" | 860 m || multiple || 2003–2021 || 18 Jan 2021 || 76 || align=left | — || 
|- id="2003 UZ319" bgcolor=#d6d6d6
| 0 ||  || MBA-O || 16.6 || 2.7 km || multiple || 2003–2021 || 17 Jan 2021 || 92 || align=left | Alt.: 2014 XL30 || 
|- id="2003 UD320" bgcolor=#fefefe
| 0 ||  || MBA-I || 18.00 || data-sort-value="0.75" | 750 m || multiple || 1994–2021 || 10 Jan 2021 || 174 || align=left | — || 
|- id="2003 UN320" bgcolor=#E9E9E9
| 0 ||  || MBA-M || 17.73 || 1.6 km || multiple || 2003–2021 || 02 Oct 2021 || 30 || align=left | Alt.: 2003 SC406 || 
|- id="2003 US320" bgcolor=#fefefe
| 1 ||  || MBA-I || 17.2 || 1.1 km || multiple || 2003–2021 || 15 Apr 2021 || 46 || align=left | Disc.: LONEOSAdded on 24 December 2021 || 
|- id="2003 UB321" bgcolor=#d6d6d6
| 0 ||  || MBA-O || 16.7 || 2.5 km || multiple || 2003–2018 || 07 Nov 2018 || 70 || align=left | Alt.: 2012 JE31 || 
|- id="2003 UD321" bgcolor=#d6d6d6
| 0 ||  || MBA-O || 16.82 || 2.4 km || multiple || 2003–2021 || 09 May 2021 || 79 || align=left | — || 
|- id="2003 UF321" bgcolor=#d6d6d6
| 0 ||  || MBA-O || 16.0 || 3.5 km || multiple || 2003–2021 || 05 Jan 2021 || 143 || align=left | Alt.: 2015 AR246, 2016 CG178 || 
|- id="2003 UJ321" bgcolor=#E9E9E9
| 2 ||  || MBA-M || 18.0 || 1.1 km || multiple || 2003–2020 || 15 Jun 2020 || 34 || align=left | — || 
|- id="2003 UK321" bgcolor=#d6d6d6
| 0 ||  || MBA-O || 16.4 || 2.9 km || multiple || 2003–2021 || 17 Jan 2021 || 133 || align=left | Alt.: 2010 EJ154, 2014 WE395 || 
|- id="2003 UT321" bgcolor=#d6d6d6
| 0 ||  || MBA-O || 17.0 || 2.2 km || multiple || 2003–2019 || 27 Oct 2019 || 57 || align=left | — || 
|- id="2003 UU321" bgcolor=#fefefe
| 0 ||  || MBA-I || 17.9 || data-sort-value="0.78" | 780 m || multiple || 2003–2019 || 10 Jan 2019 || 60 || align=left | Alt.: 2016 CS113 || 
|- id="2003 UV321" bgcolor=#fefefe
| 0 ||  || MBA-I || 17.5 || data-sort-value="0.94" | 940 m || multiple || 2003–2021 || 31 Mar 2021 || 51 || align=left | Disc.: SpacewatchAdded on 11 May 2021 || 
|- id="2003 UW321" bgcolor=#E9E9E9
| 2 ||  || MBA-M || 18.7 || data-sort-value="0.54" | 540 m || multiple || 2003–2019 || 06 Jul 2019 || 115 || align=left | Disc.: SpacewatchAdded on 5 November 2021Alt.: 2007 RM299 || 
|- id="2003 UX321" bgcolor=#E9E9E9
| 0 ||  || MBA-M || 18.0 || 1.1 km || multiple || 2003–2020 || 15 Dec 2020 || 89 || align=left | — || 
|- id="2003 UB322" bgcolor=#fefefe
| 0 ||  || MBA-I || 19.04 || data-sort-value="0.46" | 460 m || multiple || 2003–2021 || 27 Dec 2021 || 58 || align=left | — || 
|- id="2003 UL322" bgcolor=#E9E9E9
| 1 ||  || MBA-M || 18.0 || 1.4 km || multiple || 2003–2017 || 16 Nov 2017 || 26 || align=left | — || 
|- id="2003 UP322" bgcolor=#d6d6d6
| 0 ||  || MBA-O || 16.5 || 2.8 km || multiple || 2003–2020 || 09 Dec 2020 || 124 || align=left | Alt.: 2014 UP135 || 
|- id="2003 UQ322" bgcolor=#E9E9E9
| 0 ||  || MBA-M || 18.07 || 1.4 km || multiple || 2003–2021 || 06 Nov 2021 || 46 || align=left | Disc.: SpacewatchAdded on 30 September 2021 || 
|- id="2003 US322" bgcolor=#fefefe
| 2 ||  || MBA-I || 19.1 || data-sort-value="0.45" | 450 m || multiple || 2003–2020 || 12 Sep 2020 || 39 || align=left | Disc.: SpacewatchAdded on 17 June 2021Alt.: 2010 VT141, 2010 VX265 || 
|- id="2003 UW322" bgcolor=#E9E9E9
| 0 ||  || MBA-M || 17.9 || 1.1 km || multiple || 2003–2020 || 20 Oct 2020 || 91 || align=left | Disc.: LPL/Spacewatch IIAdded on 30 September 2021Alt.: 2003 UA431 || 
|- id="2003 UA323" bgcolor=#fefefe
| 0 ||  || MBA-I || 18.40 || data-sort-value="0.62" | 620 m || multiple || 2003–2021 || 27 Nov 2021 || 89 || align=left | Disc.: LPL/Spacewatch IIAdded on 21 August 2021 || 
|- id="2003 UG323" bgcolor=#d6d6d6
| 0 ||  || MBA-O || 17.1 || 2.1 km || multiple || 2003–2019 || 26 Sep 2019 || 69 || align=left | Alt.: 2014 UB81 || 
|- id="2003 UK323" bgcolor=#d6d6d6
| 0 ||  || HIL || 15.7 || 4.0 km || multiple || 1995–2020 || 19 Jan 2020 || 90 || align=left | Alt.: 2011 UM96 || 
|- id="2003 UT323" bgcolor=#fefefe
| 0 ||  || MBA-I || 18.27 || data-sort-value="0.66" | 660 m || multiple || 2003–2021 || 08 Dec 2021 || 118 || align=left | Alt.: 2016 GN77 || 
|- id="2003 UC324" bgcolor=#d6d6d6
| 0 ||  || MBA-O || 17.1 || 2.1 km || multiple || 2003–2020 || 23 Nov 2020 || 70 || align=left | — || 
|- id="2003 UK324" bgcolor=#E9E9E9
| 0 ||  || MBA-M || 17.61 || 1.3 km || multiple || 2003–2022 || 06 Jan 2022 || 78 || align=left | — || 
|- id="2003 UM324" bgcolor=#E9E9E9
| 3 ||  || MBA-M || 17.5 || data-sort-value="0.94" | 940 m || single || 86 days || 22 Oct 2003 || 9 || align=left | — || 
|- id="2003 UV324" bgcolor=#d6d6d6
| 0 ||  || MBA-O || 15.99 || 3.5 km || multiple || 2001–2020 || 12 Dec 2020 || 193 || align=left | Alt.: 2014 WB243 || 
|- id="2003 UZ324" bgcolor=#d6d6d6
| 0 ||  || MBA-O || 17.0 || 2.2 km || multiple || 2003–2021 || 09 Apr 2021 || 28 || align=left | — || 
|- id="2003 UE325" bgcolor=#d6d6d6
| 0 ||  || MBA-O || 17.09 || 2.6 km || multiple || 2003–2020 || 17 Nov 2020 || 151 || align=left | Alt.: 2009 SL57 || 
|- id="2003 UO325" bgcolor=#d6d6d6
| 2 ||  || MBA-O || 16.8 || 2.4 km || multiple || 2003–2020 || 08 Dec 2020 || 53 || align=left | — || 
|- id="2003 UR325" bgcolor=#d6d6d6
| 0 ||  || MBA-O || 17.0 || 2.2 km || multiple || 2003–2021 || 05 Jan 2021 || 87 || align=left | — || 
|- id="2003 UW325" bgcolor=#d6d6d6
| 0 ||  || MBA-O || 16.04 || 3.4 km || multiple || 2003–2022 || 27 Jan 2022 || 185 || align=left | Alt.: 2007 LC32 || 
|- id="2003 UK326" bgcolor=#fefefe
| 0 ||  || HUN || 18.3 || data-sort-value="0.65" | 650 m || multiple || 2003–2018 || 15 Jan 2018 || 49 || align=left | Alt.: 2014 SA153 || 
|- id="2003 UL326" bgcolor=#d6d6d6
| 0 ||  || MBA-O || 15.9 || 3.7 km || multiple || 2003–2020 || 24 Mar 2020 || 53 || align=left | Alt.: 2010 OC14 || 
|- id="2003 UM326" bgcolor=#E9E9E9
| 0 ||  || MBA-M || 17.55 || 1.3 km || multiple || 2003–2022 || 27 Jan 2022 || 118 || align=left | — || 
|- id="2003 UN326" bgcolor=#fefefe
| 0 ||  || MBA-I || 18.6 || data-sort-value="0.57" | 570 m || multiple || 2003–2019 || 24 Jul 2019 || 99 || align=left | Alt.: 2016 PZ11 || 
|- id="2003 UW326" bgcolor=#E9E9E9
| 0 ||  || MBA-M || 17.8 || 1.5 km || multiple || 2003–2017 || 17 Nov 2017 || 51 || align=left | Alt.: 2003 UD419 || 
|- id="2003 UY326" bgcolor=#E9E9E9
| 3 ||  || MBA-M || 18.9 || data-sort-value="0.70" | 700 m || multiple || 2003–2012 || 03 Nov 2012 || 20 || align=left | Alt.: 2012 UR39 || 
|- id="2003 UZ326" bgcolor=#d6d6d6
| 0 ||  || MBA-O || 17.6 || 1.7 km || multiple || 2003–2019 || 24 Dec 2019 || 41 || align=left | — || 
|- id="2003 UA327" bgcolor=#E9E9E9
| 0 ||  || MBA-M || 17.4 || data-sort-value="0.98" | 980 m || multiple || 2003–2021 || 18 Jan 2021 || 88 || align=left | — || 
|- id="2003 UB327" bgcolor=#E9E9E9
| 0 ||  || MBA-M || 17.07 || 1.6 km || multiple || 2003–2022 || 25 Jan 2022 || 186 || align=left | Alt.: 2012 SA63 || 
|- id="2003 UD327" bgcolor=#E9E9E9
| 0 ||  || MBA-M || 17.50 || 1.3 km || multiple || 2003–2021 || 27 Nov 2021 || 136 || align=left | Alt.: 2012 SV62 || 
|- id="2003 UJ327" bgcolor=#d6d6d6
| – ||  || MBA-O || 18.4 || 1.2 km || single || 6 days || 23 Oct 2003 || 6 || align=left | — || 
|- id="2003 UV327" bgcolor=#d6d6d6
| 0 ||  || MBA-O || 17.63 || 1.7 km || multiple || 2003–2020 || 27 Feb 2020 || 72 || align=left | Alt.: 2013 SH61 || 
|- id="2003 UB328" bgcolor=#fefefe
| 0 ||  || MBA-I || 18.1 || data-sort-value="0.71" | 710 m || multiple || 2003–2020 || 27 Feb 2020 || 71 || align=left | Alt.: 2011 WN145 || 
|- id="2003 UC328" bgcolor=#E9E9E9
| 1 ||  || MBA-M || 18.2 || data-sort-value="0.68" | 680 m || multiple || 2003–2020 || 18 Dec 2020 || 29 || align=left | — || 
|- id="2003 UW328" bgcolor=#E9E9E9
| – ||  || MBA-M || 19.1 || data-sort-value="0.45" | 450 m || single || 7 days || 24 Oct 2003 || 8 || align=left | — || 
|- id="2003 UY328" bgcolor=#d6d6d6
| 0 ||  || MBA-O || 16.8 || 2.4 km || multiple || 2003–2020 || 12 Dec 2020 || 127 || align=left | Alt.: 2014 TD9 || 
|- id="2003 UE329" bgcolor=#d6d6d6
| 1 ||  || MBA-O || 17.1 || 2.1 km || multiple || 2003–2020 || 08 Nov 2020 || 53 || align=left | — || 
|- id="2003 UF329" bgcolor=#d6d6d6
| 0 ||  || MBA-O || 17.0 || 2.2 km || multiple || 2003–2020 || 19 Jan 2020 || 90 || align=left | Alt.: 2014 WH235 || 
|- id="2003 UG329" bgcolor=#FA8072
| 0 ||  || HUN || 19.3 || data-sort-value="0.41" | 410 m || multiple || 2003–2020 || 15 Oct 2020 || 38 || align=left | Disc.: SDSSAdded on 9 March 2021Alt.: 2012 GF5 || 
|- id="2003 UM329" bgcolor=#E9E9E9
| 1 ||  || MBA-M || 17.9 || data-sort-value="0.78" | 780 m || multiple || 2003–2015 || 28 Jul 2015 || 50 || align=left | — || 
|- id="2003 UQ329" bgcolor=#fefefe
| 1 ||  || MBA-I || 18.92 || data-sort-value="0.49" | 490 m || multiple || 2003–2022 || 27 Jan 2022 || 47 || align=left | — || 
|- id="2003 UU329" bgcolor=#E9E9E9
| 0 ||  || MBA-M || 18.11 || 1.0 km || multiple || 2003–2021 || 09 Dec 2021 || 72 || align=left | — || 
|- id="2003 UX329" bgcolor=#d6d6d6
| 0 ||  || MBA-O || 16.5 || 2.8 km || multiple || 2003–2020 || 17 Dec 2020 || 144 || align=left | Alt.: 2009 WF68 || 
|- id="2003 UB330" bgcolor=#E9E9E9
| 1 ||  || MBA-M || 17.8 || 1.2 km || multiple || 2003–2021 || 05 Jan 2021 || 94 || align=left | — || 
|- id="2003 UC330" bgcolor=#E9E9E9
| 0 ||  || MBA-M || 17.58 || 1.7 km || multiple || 2003–2021 || 27 Oct 2021 || 77 || align=left | Disc.: LPL/Spacewatch IIAdded on 19 October 2020Alt.: 2012 SF22, 2015 HN136 || 
|- id="2003 UG330" bgcolor=#E9E9E9
| 0 ||  || MBA-M || 16.8 || 1.3 km || multiple || 2003–2021 || 09 Jan 2021 || 154 || align=left | — || 
|- id="2003 UK330" bgcolor=#d6d6d6
| 0 ||  || MBA-O || 16.8 || 2.4 km || multiple || 2003–2021 || 04 Jan 2021 || 70 || align=left | — || 
|- id="2003 UN330" bgcolor=#d6d6d6
| 0 ||  || MBA-O || 16.66 || 2.6 km || multiple || 2003–2021 || 04 Mar 2021 || 135 || align=left | — || 
|- id="2003 US330" bgcolor=#E9E9E9
| 0 ||  || MBA-M || 17.42 || 1.8 km || multiple || 2003–2021 || 23 May 2021 || 45 || align=left | — || 
|- id="2003 UA331" bgcolor=#d6d6d6
| 0 ||  || MBA-O || 16.73 || 2.5 km || multiple || 2003–2022 || 26 Jan 2022 || 103 || align=left | — || 
|- id="2003 UB331" bgcolor=#d6d6d6
| 0 ||  || MBA-O || 16.25 || 3.1 km || multiple || 2003–2022 || 27 Jan 2022 || 166 || align=left | Alt.: 2007 JR11, 2010 AF129 || 
|- id="2003 UE331" bgcolor=#E9E9E9
| 0 ||  || MBA-M || 17.7 || data-sort-value="0.86" | 860 m || multiple || 1999–2021 || 18 Jan 2021 || 87 || align=left | — || 
|- id="2003 UH332" bgcolor=#E9E9E9
| 1 ||  || MBA-M || 17.7 || 1.6 km || multiple || 2003–2019 || 02 Jan 2019 || 47 || align=left | — || 
|- id="2003 US332" bgcolor=#d6d6d6
| 0 ||  || MBA-O || 15.89 || 3.7 km || multiple || 1998–2021 || 30 Nov 2021 || 187 || align=left | Alt.: 2009 SU115 || 
|- id="2003 UU332" bgcolor=#fefefe
| 0 ||  || MBA-I || 18.8 || data-sort-value="0.52" | 520 m || multiple || 2003–2020 || 18 Jul 2020 || 112 || align=left | — || 
|- id="2003 UY332" bgcolor=#d6d6d6
| 1 ||  || MBA-O || 17.6 || 1.7 km || multiple || 2003–2019 || 21 Oct 2019 || 38 || align=left | Disc.: SDSSAdded on 22 July 2020 || 
|- id="2003 UB333" bgcolor=#E9E9E9
| 0 ||  || MBA-M || 17.06 || 2.2 km || multiple || 2003–2021 || 06 Nov 2021 || 133 || align=left | — || 
|- id="2003 UC333" bgcolor=#fefefe
| 0 ||  || MBA-I || 17.50 || data-sort-value="0.94" | 940 m || multiple || 1994–2021 || 08 May 2021 || 179 || align=left | — || 
|- id="2003 UD333" bgcolor=#E9E9E9
| 2 ||  || MBA-M || 18.5 || data-sort-value="0.59" | 590 m || multiple || 1995–2019 || 20 Sep 2019 || 41 || align=left | — || 
|- id="2003 UG333" bgcolor=#d6d6d6
| 4 ||  || MBA-O || 17.6 || 1.7 km || single || 36 days || 23 Oct 2003 || 10 || align=left | Disc.: SDSSAdded on 29 January 2022 || 
|- id="2003 UR333" bgcolor=#fefefe
| 0 ||  || MBA-I || 19.2 || data-sort-value="0.43" | 430 m || multiple || 2003–2019 || 01 Jun 2019 || 34 || align=left | Alt.: 2013 TR62 || 
|- id="2003 UW333" bgcolor=#E9E9E9
| 1 ||  || MBA-M || 18.5 || data-sort-value="0.84" | 840 m || multiple || 2003–2016 || 06 Oct 2016 || 51 || align=left | — || 
|- id="2003 UY333" bgcolor=#d6d6d6
| 0 ||  || HIL || 16.6 || 2.7 km || multiple || 1995–2020 || 08 Dec 2020 || 61 || align=left | Alt.: 2011 SB29 || 
|- id="2003 UC334" bgcolor=#d6d6d6
| 0 ||  || MBA-O || 17.2 || 2.0 km || multiple || 2003–2019 || 03 Oct 2019 || 49 || align=left | — || 
|- id="2003 UN334" bgcolor=#fefefe
| 0 ||  || MBA-I || 19.0 || data-sort-value="0.47" | 470 m || multiple || 2000–2019 || 29 Jul 2019 || 60 || align=left | — || 
|- id="2003 UV334" bgcolor=#E9E9E9
| 0 ||  || MBA-M || 17.35 || 1.9 km || multiple || 2003–2021 || 25 Nov 2021 || 113 || align=left | — || 
|- id="2003 UX334" bgcolor=#E9E9E9
| 0 ||  || MBA-M || 17.6 || 1.7 km || multiple || 2003–2020 || 22 Apr 2020 || 64 || align=left | Alt.: 2017 UJ32 || 
|- id="2003 UY334" bgcolor=#fefefe
| 0 ||  || MBA-I || 18.0 || data-sort-value="0.75" | 750 m || multiple || 2003–2021 || 08 Jun 2021 || 92 || align=left | Alt.: 2007 VJ32 || 
|- id="2003 UA335" bgcolor=#fefefe
| 0 ||  || MBA-I || 18.55 || data-sort-value="0.58" | 580 m || multiple || 2002–2021 || 31 Aug 2021 || 55 || align=left | Disc.: SDSSAdded on 17 January 2021 || 
|- id="2003 UG335" bgcolor=#E9E9E9
| 0 ||  || MBA-M || 17.10 || 2.1 km || multiple || 2001–2021 || 20 Jul 2021 || 70 || align=left | — || 
|- id="2003 UN335" bgcolor=#fefefe
| 1 ||  || MBA-I || 19.1 || data-sort-value="0.45" | 450 m || multiple || 2003–2019 || 24 Oct 2019 || 152 || align=left | — || 
|- id="2003 UQ335" bgcolor=#E9E9E9
| 0 ||  || MBA-M || 18.16 || 1.3 km || multiple || 2003–2021 || 08 Sep 2021 || 43 || align=left | — || 
|- id="2003 UU335" bgcolor=#d6d6d6
| 0 ||  || MBA-O || 17.6 || 1.7 km || multiple || 2003–2021 || 18 Jan 2021 || 59 || align=left | Alt.: 2008 QN3 || 
|- id="2003 UZ335" bgcolor=#E9E9E9
| 0 ||  || MBA-M || 17.87 || 1.5 km || multiple || 2003–2021 || 27 Oct 2021 || 135 || align=left | — || 
|- id="2003 UA336" bgcolor=#E9E9E9
| 0 ||  || MBA-M || 18.26 || data-sort-value="0.94" | 940 m || multiple || 2003–2022 || 24 Jan 2022 || 57 || align=left | Disc.: SDSSAdded on 22 July 2020 || 
|- id="2003 UB336" bgcolor=#E9E9E9
| 3 ||  || MBA-M || 18.9 || data-sort-value="0.70" | 700 m || multiple || 2003–2016 || 01 Nov 2016 || 31 || align=left | — || 
|- id="2003 UE336" bgcolor=#d6d6d6
| 1 ||  || MBA-O || 17.8 || 1.5 km || multiple || 2003–2020 || 16 Oct 2020 || 18 || align=left | Disc.: SDSSAdded on 21 August 2021 || 
|- id="2003 UH336" bgcolor=#E9E9E9
| 1 ||  || MBA-M || 18.4 || data-sort-value="0.88" | 880 m || multiple || 2003–2020 || 15 Oct 2020 || 35 || align=left | — || 
|- id="2003 UJ336" bgcolor=#d6d6d6
| – ||  || MBA-O || 17.9 || 1.5 km || single || 6 days || 24 Oct 2003 || 6 || align=left | — || 
|- id="2003 UM336" bgcolor=#d6d6d6
| 0 ||  || MBA-O || 17.6 || 1.7 km || multiple || 2003–2019 || 01 Nov 2019 || 56 || align=left | — || 
|- id="2003 UN336" bgcolor=#E9E9E9
| 1 ||  || MBA-M || 18.83 || data-sort-value="0.72" | 720 m || multiple || 2003–2021 || 02 Dec 2021 || 28 || align=left | — || 
|- id="2003 UQ336" bgcolor=#d6d6d6
| 0 ||  || MBA-O || 16.9 || 2.3 km || multiple || 2003–2021 || 07 Jan 2021 || 70 || align=left | — || 
|- id="2003 UR336" bgcolor=#E9E9E9
| 0 ||  || MBA-M || 17.98 || 1.4 km || multiple || 2003–2021 || 04 Oct 2021 || 35 || align=left | Disc.: SDSSAdded on 30 September 2021Alt.: 2021 QF37 || 
|- id="2003 UT336" bgcolor=#fefefe
| 1 ||  || MBA-I || 19.06 || data-sort-value="0.46" | 460 m || multiple || 2003–2021 || 09 Jun 2021 || 48 || align=left | Alt.: 2003 UK337 || 
|- id="2003 UV336" bgcolor=#d6d6d6
| 1 ||  || MBA-O || 16.9 || 2.3 km || multiple || 2003–2020 || 11 Dec 2020 || 73 || align=left | — || 
|- id="2003 UW336" bgcolor=#E9E9E9
| 2 ||  || MBA-M || 18.2 || data-sort-value="0.96" | 960 m || multiple || 2003–2016 || 10 Sep 2016 || 25 || align=left | — || 
|- id="2003 UX336" bgcolor=#E9E9E9
| 0 ||  || MBA-M || 17.91 || 1.1 km || multiple || 2003–2022 || 07 Jan 2022 || 53 || align=left | Alt.: 2006 HU145 || 
|- id="2003 UB337" bgcolor=#d6d6d6
| 2 ||  || MBA-O || 17.80 || 1.5 km || multiple || 2003–2019 || 02 Nov 2019 || 63 || align=left | — || 
|- id="2003 UD337" bgcolor=#E9E9E9
| 0 ||  || MBA-M || 18.43 || 1.1 km || multiple || 2003–2021 || 31 Oct 2021 || 64 || align=left | — || 
|- id="2003 UM337" bgcolor=#fefefe
| 3 ||  || MBA-I || 19.8 || data-sort-value="0.33" | 330 m || multiple || 2003–2020 || 12 Sep 2020 || 19 || align=left | Disc.: SpacewatchAdded on 19 October 2020 || 
|- id="2003 UO337" bgcolor=#fefefe
| 0 ||  || MBA-I || 18.64 || data-sort-value="0.56" | 560 m || multiple || 2003–2021 || 07 Apr 2021 || 56 || align=left | — || 
|- id="2003 UU337" bgcolor=#d6d6d6
| 0 ||  || MBA-O || 17.0 || 2.2 km || multiple || 2003–2019 || 28 Dec 2019 || 73 || align=left | — || 
|- id="2003 UW337" bgcolor=#d6d6d6
| 0 ||  || MBA-O || 17.1 || 2.1 km || multiple || 1992–2020 || 20 Oct 2020 || 66 || align=left | — || 
|- id="2003 UX337" bgcolor=#d6d6d6
| 0 ||  || MBA-O || 16.8 || 2.4 km || multiple || 2003–2021 || 18 Jan 2021 || 84 || align=left | Alt.: 2016 CG146 || 
|- id="2003 UD338" bgcolor=#fefefe
| 1 ||  || MBA-I || 19.57 || data-sort-value="0.36" | 360 m || multiple || 2003–2021 || 01 Nov 2021 || 31 || align=left | — || 
|- id="2003 UL338" bgcolor=#E9E9E9
| 0 ||  || MBA-M || 18.2 || data-sort-value="0.68" | 680 m || multiple || 2001–2021 || 05 Jan 2021 || 40 || align=left | — || 
|- id="2003 UN338" bgcolor=#fefefe
| 0 ||  || MBA-I || 18.6 || data-sort-value="0.57" | 570 m || multiple || 2003–2018 || 13 Aug 2018 || 39 || align=left | Alt.: 2007 VF129 || 
|- id="2003 UU338" bgcolor=#E9E9E9
| 1 ||  || MBA-M || 19.18 || data-sort-value="0.81" | 810 m || multiple || 2003–2021 || 28 Oct 2021 || 35 || align=left | — || 
|- id="2003 UX338" bgcolor=#E9E9E9
| 1 ||  || MBA-M || 17.4 || 1.4 km || multiple || 2001–2018 || 28 Jan 2018 || 24 || align=left | — || 
|- id="2003 UY338" bgcolor=#E9E9E9
| – ||  || MBA-M || 19.4 || data-sort-value="0.39" | 390 m || single || 6 days || 24 Oct 2003 || 7 || align=left | — || 
|- id="2003 UD339" bgcolor=#E9E9E9
| 2 ||  || MBA-M || 19.1 || data-sort-value="0.84" | 840 m || multiple || 2003–2017 || 22 Nov 2017 || 26 || align=left | Alt.: 2017 UO75 || 
|- id="2003 UE339" bgcolor=#fefefe
| 3 ||  || MBA-I || 19.5 || data-sort-value="0.37" | 370 m || multiple || 2003–2021 || 14 Apr 2021 || 34 || align=left | Disc.: SpacewatchAdded on 21 August 2021Alt.: 2019 UX51 || 
|- id="2003 UO339" bgcolor=#E9E9E9
| 2 ||  || MBA-M || 19.4 || data-sort-value="0.39" | 390 m || multiple || 2003–2019 || 01 Oct 2019 || 34 || align=left | Disc.: SpacewatchAdded on 17 January 2021Alt.: 2015 TT54 || 
|- id="2003 US339" bgcolor=#E9E9E9
| 1 ||  || MBA-M || 18.5 || data-sort-value="0.84" | 840 m || multiple || 2003–2020 || 17 Nov 2020 || 28 || align=left | Disc.: SpacewatchAdded on 9 March 2021 || 
|- id="2003 UZ339" bgcolor=#d6d6d6
| 0 ||  || MBA-O || 17.2 || 2.0 km || multiple || 2003–2021 || 17 Jan 2021 || 54 || align=left | Disc.: LPL/Spacewatch IIAdded on 22 July 2020 || 
|- id="2003 UH340" bgcolor=#fefefe
| 1 ||  || MBA-I || 18.7 || data-sort-value="0.54" | 540 m || multiple || 1999–2020 || 25 Jan 2020 || 35 || align=left | Alt.: 2007 VY105 || 
|- id="2003 UJ340" bgcolor=#E9E9E9
| 0 ||  || MBA-M || 17.7 || data-sort-value="0.86" | 860 m || multiple || 2003–2021 || 05 Jan 2021 || 59 || align=left | — || 
|- id="2003 UN340" bgcolor=#d6d6d6
| 3 ||  || MBA-O || 17.7 || 1.6 km || multiple || 2003–2019 || 28 Aug 2019 || 27 || align=left | — || 
|- id="2003 UO340" bgcolor=#d6d6d6
| 0 ||  || MBA-O || 17.51 || 1.8 km || multiple || 2003–2021 || 09 Apr 2021 || 65 || align=left | — || 
|- id="2003 UT340" bgcolor=#d6d6d6
| 2 ||  || MBA-O || 17.4 || 1.8 km || multiple || 2003–2020 || 12 Dec 2020 || 32 || align=left | Disc.: SpacewatchAdded on 17 January 2021 || 
|- id="2003 UV340" bgcolor=#d6d6d6
| 0 ||  || MBA-O || 16.5 || 2.8 km || multiple || 2003–2021 || 12 Jan 2021 || 94 || align=left | Alt.: 2010 AZ38 || 
|- id="2003 UC341" bgcolor=#E9E9E9
| 1 ||  || MBA-M || 18.0 || 1.1 km || multiple || 2003–2020 || 09 Dec 2020 || 51 || align=left | Disc.: SpacewatchAdded on 17 January 2021Alt.: 2014 EM185 || 
|- id="2003 UK341" bgcolor=#E9E9E9
| 2 ||  || MBA-M || 17.2 || 1.1 km || multiple || 2003–2021 || 18 Jan 2021 || 63 || align=left | Disc.: SDSSAdded on 17 January 2021 || 
|- id="2003 UO341" bgcolor=#E9E9E9
| 0 ||  || MBA-M || 16.46 || 1.5 km || multiple || 2003–2022 || 25 Jan 2022 || 157 || align=left | — || 
|- id="2003 US341" bgcolor=#d6d6d6
| 0 ||  || MBA-O || 16.09 || 4.9 km || multiple || 2003–2022 || 25 Jan 2022 || 186 || align=left | Alt.: 2003 SR113, 2010 BN36 || 
|- id="2003 UT341" bgcolor=#fefefe
| 0 ||  || MBA-I || 18.6 || 1.3 km || multiple || 2003–2020 || 11 Oct 2020 || 73 || align=left | — || 
|- id="2003 UV341" bgcolor=#d6d6d6
| 0 ||  || MBA-O || 16.8 || 2.4 km || multiple || 2003–2021 || 04 Jan 2021 || 93 || align=left | — || 
|- id="2003 UW341" bgcolor=#fefefe
| 0 ||  || HUN || 18.22 || data-sort-value="0.67" | 670 m || multiple || 1995–2021 || 17 May 2021 || 134 || align=left | — || 
|- id="2003 UX341" bgcolor=#fefefe
| 0 ||  || HUN || 18.48 || data-sort-value="0.60" | 600 m || multiple || 2003–2021 || 09 Apr 2021 || 83 || align=left | — || 
|- id="2003 UB342" bgcolor=#E9E9E9
| 0 ||  || MBA-M || 18.1 || 1.0 km || multiple || 2003–2020 || 05 Nov 2020 || 61 || align=left | Disc.: SDSSAdded on 17 January 2021 || 
|- id="2003 UC342" bgcolor=#d6d6d6
| 0 ||  || MBA-O || 17.0 || 2.2 km || multiple || 2000–2019 || 24 Aug 2019 || 57 || align=left | Alt.: 2010 CD13 || 
|- id="2003 UM342" bgcolor=#E9E9E9
| 0 ||  || MBA-M || 16.42 || 2.9 km || multiple || 2003–2021 || 09 Aug 2021 || 197 || align=left | Alt.: 2010 CQ117, 2012 PN33, 2013 YS66 || 
|- id="2003 UW342" bgcolor=#E9E9E9
| 0 ||  || MBA-M || 17.7 || data-sort-value="0.86" | 860 m || multiple || 1999–2021 || 16 Jan 2021 || 48 || align=left | — || 
|- id="2003 UB343" bgcolor=#d6d6d6
| 1 ||  || MBA-O || 17.5 || 1.8 km || multiple || 2003–2020 || 16 Mar 2020 || 35 || align=left | — || 
|- id="2003 UG343" bgcolor=#d6d6d6
| 0 ||  || MBA-O || 16.8 || 2.4 km || multiple || 2003–2020 || 22 Oct 2020 || 69 || align=left | — || 
|- id="2003 UO343" bgcolor=#E9E9E9
| – ||  || MBA-M || 19.9 || data-sort-value="0.44" | 440 m || single || 4 days || 23 Oct 2003 || 6 || align=left | — || 
|- id="2003 UT343" bgcolor=#fefefe
| 1 ||  || MBA-I || 18.9 || data-sort-value="0.49" | 490 m || multiple || 2002–2019 || 31 Oct 2019 || 27 || align=left | — || 
|- id="2003 UY343" bgcolor=#d6d6d6
| 0 ||  || MBA-O || 16.9 || 2.3 km || multiple || 2003–2019 || 27 Oct 2019 || 73 || align=left | Alt.: 2016 CK140 || 
|- id="2003 UC344" bgcolor=#d6d6d6
| 0 ||  || MBA-O || 16.76 || 2.5 km || multiple || 2003–2022 || 07 Jan 2022 || 116 || align=left | Alt.: 2010 BT115 || 
|- id="2003 UD344" bgcolor=#fefefe
| 1 ||  || MBA-I || 18.8 || data-sort-value="0.52" | 520 m || multiple || 2003–2020 || 22 Aug 2020 || 72 || align=left | — || 
|- id="2003 UG344" bgcolor=#d6d6d6
| 0 ||  || HIL || 15.9 || 3.7 km || multiple || 1995–2021 || 17 Jan 2021 || 102 || align=left | Alt.: 2006 HS141 || 
|- id="2003 UM344" bgcolor=#E9E9E9
| 0 ||  || MBA-M || 18.2 || data-sort-value="0.68" | 680 m || multiple || 2003–2020 || 17 Dec 2020 || 36 || align=left | Disc.: SDSSAdded on 11 May 2021 || 
|- id="2003 UN344" bgcolor=#fefefe
| 0 ||  || HUN || 19.63 || data-sort-value="0.35" | 350 m || multiple || 2003–2021 || 09 Nov 2021 || 29 || align=left | — || 
|- id="2003 UO344" bgcolor=#E9E9E9
| 1 ||  || MBA-M || 18.48 || 1.1 km || multiple || 2003–2021 || 27 Oct 2021 || 54 || align=left | Disc.: SDSSAdded on 30 September 2021 || 
|- id="2003 UP344" bgcolor=#fefefe
| 1 ||  || MBA-I || 18.5 || data-sort-value="0.59" | 590 m || multiple || 2003–2015 || 08 Dec 2015 || 25 || align=left | — || 
|- id="2003 US344" bgcolor=#fefefe
| 0 ||  || MBA-I || 18.8 || data-sort-value="0.52" | 520 m || multiple || 2003–2018 || 17 Aug 2018 || 29 || align=left | Alt.: 2007 WT21 || 
|- id="2003 UB345" bgcolor=#d6d6d6
| 0 ||  || MBA-O || 17.27 || 2.0 km || multiple || 1998–2021 || 09 May 2021 || 73 || align=left | Alt.: 2013 RE25 || 
|- id="2003 UH345" bgcolor=#d6d6d6
| 0 ||  || MBA-O || 17.76 || 1.6 km || multiple || 1998–2019 || 28 Oct 2019 || 49 || align=left | — || 
|- id="2003 UK345" bgcolor=#fefefe
| 0 ||  || MBA-I || 18.8 || data-sort-value="0.52" | 520 m || multiple || 2003–2020 || 11 Oct 2020 || 56 || align=left | — || 
|- id="2003 UL345" bgcolor=#fefefe
| 0 ||  || MBA-I || 18.86 || data-sort-value="0.50" | 500 m || multiple || 2003–2021 || 30 Nov 2021 || 54 || align=left | Alt.: 2010 HP132 || 
|- id="2003 UT345" bgcolor=#fefefe
| 3 ||  || MBA-I || 19.3 || data-sort-value="0.41" | 410 m || multiple || 2003–2014 || 25 Oct 2014 || 18 || align=left | Disc.: SDSSAdded on 21 August 2021 || 
|- id="2003 UX345" bgcolor=#E9E9E9
| 0 ||  || MBA-M || 17.69 || 1.6 km || multiple || 2003–2021 || 29 Nov 2021 || 102 || align=left | Alt.: 2012 RV39 || 
|- id="2003 UA346" bgcolor=#fefefe
| 0 ||  || MBA-I || 19.1 || data-sort-value="0.45" | 450 m || multiple || 2003–2018 || 05 Oct 2018 || 32 || align=left | — || 
|- id="2003 UC346" bgcolor=#d6d6d6
| 3 ||  || MBA-O || 17.4 || 1.8 km || multiple || 2003–2020 || 14 Dec 2020 || 29 || align=left | Disc.: SDSSAdded on 17 June 2021Alt.: 2019 RW55 || 
|- id="2003 UF346" bgcolor=#E9E9E9
| 0 ||  || MBA-M || 17.6 || 1.3 km || multiple || 2003–2020 || 17 Oct 2020 || 56 || align=left | Disc.: SDSSAdded on 17 January 2021 || 
|- id="2003 UK346" bgcolor=#d6d6d6
| 3 ||  || MBA-O || 17.7 || 1.6 km || multiple || 2003–2020 || 23 Oct 2020 || 21 || align=left | Disc.: SDSSAdded on 21 August 2021 || 
|- id="2003 UN346" bgcolor=#fefefe
| 0 ||  || MBA-I || 18.5 || data-sort-value="0.59" | 590 m || multiple || 2003–2020 || 15 Oct 2020 || 84 || align=left | — || 
|- id="2003 UP346" bgcolor=#d6d6d6
| 0 ||  || MBA-O || 16.56 || 2.7 km || multiple || 2001–2022 || 13 Jan 2022 || 105 || align=left | — || 
|- id="2003 UT346" bgcolor=#d6d6d6
| 0 ||  || MBA-O || 17.4 || 1.8 km || multiple || 2003–2021 || 08 Jun 2021 || 53 || align=left | — || 
|- id="2003 UW346" bgcolor=#d6d6d6
| 0 ||  || MBA-O || 16.6 || 2.7 km || multiple || 2001–2020 || 24 Oct 2020 || 97 || align=left | Alt.: 2013 LN3, 2014 MC34 || 
|- id="2003 UA347" bgcolor=#fefefe
| 1 ||  || MBA-I || 19.4 || data-sort-value="0.39" | 390 m || multiple || 2003–2020 || 10 Oct 2020 || 44 || align=left | Disc.: SDSSAdded on 19 October 2020 || 
|- id="2003 UB347" bgcolor=#fefefe
| 0 ||  || MBA-I || 18.53 || data-sort-value="0.58" | 580 m || multiple || 2003–2021 || 08 May 2021 || 118 || align=left | — || 
|- id="2003 UC347" bgcolor=#d6d6d6
| 1 ||  || MBA-O || 17.1 || 2.1 km || multiple || 2003–2020 || 12 Dec 2020 || 77 || align=left | Alt.: 2010 CH213 || 
|- id="2003 UF347" bgcolor=#d6d6d6
| 0 ||  || MBA-O || 17.23 || 2.0 km || multiple || 1998–2021 || 14 Jul 2021 || 72 || align=left | — || 
|- id="2003 UG347" bgcolor=#d6d6d6
| 0 ||  || MBA-O || 17.1 || 2.1 km || multiple || 2003–2020 || 14 Dec 2020 || 58 || align=left | Alt.: 2014 OG191 || 
|- id="2003 UL347" bgcolor=#d6d6d6
| 0 ||  || MBA-O || 16.8 || 2.4 km || multiple || 2003–2020 || 17 Nov 2020 || 70 || align=left | Alt.: 2015 XL260, 2017 FE25 || 
|- id="2003 UN347" bgcolor=#d6d6d6
| 0 ||  || MBA-O || 16.9 || 2.3 km || multiple || 2003–2020 || 17 Dec 2020 || 22 || align=left | — || 
|- id="2003 UP347" bgcolor=#d6d6d6
| 1 ||  || MBA-O || 17.6 || 1.7 km || multiple || 2003–2020 || 18 Dec 2020 || 25 || align=left | Alt.: 2014 SD196 || 
|- id="2003 UY347" bgcolor=#E9E9E9
| 0 ||  || MBA-M || 17.53 || 1.3 km || multiple || 2003–2021 || 16 Nov 2021 || 49 || align=left | Alt.: 2012 UW86, 2012 XX159, 2015 HG119 || 
|- id="2003 UC348" bgcolor=#fefefe
| 0 ||  || HUN || 19.66 || data-sort-value="0.35" | 350 m || multiple || 2003–2021 || 10 May 2021 || 38 || align=left | — || 
|- id="2003 UG348" bgcolor=#fefefe
| 0 ||  || MBA-I || 18.5 || data-sort-value="0.59" | 590 m || multiple || 1992–2018 || 13 Dec 2018 || 39 || align=left | Disc.: SDSSAdded on 22 July 2020 || 
|- id="2003 UN348" bgcolor=#d6d6d6
| 0 ||  || MBA-O || 17.1 || 2.1 km || multiple || 2003–2020 || 08 Dec 2020 || 44 || align=left | — || 
|- id="2003 UO348" bgcolor=#fefefe
| 0 ||  || MBA-I || 17.9 || data-sort-value="0.78" | 780 m || multiple || 2003–2020 || 02 Feb 2020 || 86 || align=left | — || 
|- id="2003 UP348" bgcolor=#E9E9E9
| 3 ||  || MBA-M || 18.4 || data-sort-value="0.62" | 620 m || multiple || 2003–2021 || 16 Jan 2021 || 15 || align=left | Disc.: SDSSAdded on 5 November 2021 || 
|- id="2003 US348" bgcolor=#fefefe
| 0 ||  || MBA-I || 18.48 || data-sort-value="0.60" | 600 m || multiple || 2003–2021 || 11 May 2021 || 110 || align=left | Alt.: 2015 XE349 || 
|- id="2003 UW348" bgcolor=#d6d6d6
| 0 ||  || MBA-O || 17.4 || 1.8 km || multiple || 2003–2019 || 04 Nov 2019 || 55 || align=left | — || 
|- id="2003 UM349" bgcolor=#d6d6d6
| 0 ||  || MBA-O || 16.9 || 2.3 km || multiple || 2003–2019 || 19 Dec 2019 || 63 || align=left | Alt.: 2017 HB30 || 
|- id="2003 UR349" bgcolor=#fefefe
| 0 ||  || HUN || 18.7 || data-sort-value="0.54" | 540 m || multiple || 2003–2021 || 02 Apr 2021 || 34 || align=left | — || 
|- id="2003 UT349" bgcolor=#d6d6d6
| 0 ||  || MBA-O || 17.4 || 1.8 km || multiple || 2003–2021 || 12 Feb 2021 || 36 || align=left | Disc.: SDSSAdded on 11 May 2021Alt.: 2014 WW450 || 
|- id="2003 UZ349" bgcolor=#fefefe
| 0 ||  || MBA-I || 18.18 || data-sort-value="0.69" | 690 m || multiple || 2001–2021 || 18 Apr 2021 || 55 || align=left | Alt.: 2007 UU23 || 
|- id="2003 UG350" bgcolor=#E9E9E9
| 3 ||  || MBA-M || 18.68 || 1.0 km || multiple || 2003–2017 || 21 Nov 2017 || 17 || align=left | Disc.: SDSSAdded on 17 June 2021 || 
|- id="2003 UJ350" bgcolor=#d6d6d6
| 0 ||  || MBA-O || 16.62 || 2.6 km || multiple || 2003–2021 || 31 Mar 2021 || 85 || align=left | Disc.: SDSSAdded on 22 July 2020Alt.: 2003 UY381, 2008 RB64 || 
|- id="2003 UN350" bgcolor=#d6d6d6
| – ||  || MBA-O || 17.6 || 1.7 km || single || 5 days || 24 Oct 2003 || 6 || align=left | — || 
|- id="2003 UO350" bgcolor=#d6d6d6
| 0 ||  || HIL || 16.2 || 3.2 km || multiple || 1995–2019 || 25 Nov 2019 || 53 || align=left | Alt.: 2011 UT19 || 
|- id="2003 UT350" bgcolor=#E9E9E9
| 0 ||  || MBA-M || 17.1 || 1.6 km || multiple || 2003–2021 || 13 Jan 2021 || 159 || align=left | — || 
|- id="2003 UY350" bgcolor=#fefefe
| 0 ||  || MBA-I || 18.86 || data-sort-value="0.50" | 500 m || multiple || 2003–2021 || 30 Sep 2021 || 53 || align=left | — || 
|- id="2003 UM351" bgcolor=#E9E9E9
| 3 ||  || MBA-M || 19.0 || data-sort-value="0.47" | 470 m || multiple || 2003–2020 || 19 Dec 2020 || 14 || align=left | — || 
|- id="2003 UN351" bgcolor=#fefefe
| 0 ||  || MBA-I || 19.1 || data-sort-value="0.45" | 450 m || multiple || 2003–2020 || 10 Dec 2020 || 62 || align=left | — || 
|- id="2003 UR351" bgcolor=#E9E9E9
| 0 ||  || MBA-M || 17.84 || 1.1 km || multiple || 1996–2021 || 02 Dec 2021 || 72 || align=left | Disc.: SDSSAdded on 24 December 2021 || 
|- id="2003 US351" bgcolor=#E9E9E9
| 0 ||  || MBA-M || 17.92 || 1.5 km || multiple || 2003–2021 || 27 Nov 2021 || 59 || align=left | Disc.: SDSSAdded on 5 November 2021Alt.: 2012 TJ127, 2021 RT15 || 
|- id="2003 UD352" bgcolor=#d6d6d6
| 0 ||  || MBA-O || 16.9 || 2.3 km || multiple || 2003–2021 || 15 Jan 2021 || 68 || align=left | — || 
|- id="2003 UE352" bgcolor=#E9E9E9
| 0 ||  || MBA-M || 17.31 || 1.9 km || multiple || 2003–2021 || 08 Sep 2021 || 85 || align=left | Alt.: 2005 EX190 || 
|- id="2003 UK352" bgcolor=#d6d6d6
| 0 ||  || MBA-O || 16.7 || 2.5 km || multiple || 2003–2020 || 14 Nov 2020 || 47 || align=left | Disc.: SDSSAdded on 17 January 2021 || 
|- id="2003 UL352" bgcolor=#d6d6d6
| 0 ||  || MBA-O || 17.1 || 2.1 km || multiple || 2003–2020 || 09 Dec 2020 || 45 || align=left | Disc.: SDSSAdded on 22 July 2020 || 
|- id="2003 UM352" bgcolor=#d6d6d6
| 0 ||  || MBA-O || 17.34 || 1.9 km || multiple || 2001–2020 || 14 Oct 2020 || 50 || align=left | Disc.: SDSSAdded on 17 January 2021Alt.: 2010 BB147 || 
|- id="2003 UP352" bgcolor=#E9E9E9
| – ||  || MBA-M || 18.9 || data-sort-value="0.49" | 490 m || single || 47 days || 16 Nov 2003 || 10 || align=left | — || 
|- id="2003 UY352" bgcolor=#E9E9E9
| 0 ||  || MBA-M || 17.3 || 1.0 km || multiple || 2003–2021 || 15 Jan 2021 || 87 || align=left | Alt.: 2013 EQ9 || 
|- id="2003 UE353" bgcolor=#d6d6d6
| 0 ||  || MBA-O || 16.79 || 2.4 km || multiple || 2003–2022 || 12 Jan 2022 || 109 || align=left | Alt.: 2014 WR152 || 
|- id="2003 UF353" bgcolor=#E9E9E9
| – ||  || MBA-M || 19.0 || data-sort-value="0.67" | 670 m || single || 4 days || 23 Oct 2003 || 6 || align=left | — || 
|- id="2003 UG353" bgcolor=#d6d6d6
| 0 ||  || MBA-O || 16.99 || 2.2 km || multiple || 2003–2022 || 25 Jan 2022 || 104 || align=left | Alt.: 2010 CK258, 2014 UM155 || 
|- id="2003 UP353" bgcolor=#E9E9E9
| 0 ||  || MBA-M || 16.8 || 1.3 km || multiple || 2003–2021 || 07 Jan 2021 || 155 || align=left | Alt.: 2010 DT19, 2015 TV40 || 
|- id="2003 US353" bgcolor=#fefefe
| 0 ||  || MBA-I || 19.4 || data-sort-value="0.39" | 390 m || multiple || 2003–2020 || 06 Dec 2020 || 49 || align=left | — || 
|- id="2003 UU353" bgcolor=#E9E9E9
| 0 ||  || MBA-M || 17.13 || 1.6 km || multiple || 2003–2021 || 03 Dec 2021 || 95 || align=left | Alt.: 2014 EH175 || 
|- id="2003 UW353" bgcolor=#E9E9E9
| 0 ||  || MBA-M || 18.41 || 1.2 km || multiple || 2003–2021 || 28 Nov 2021 || 51 || align=left | — || 
|- id="2003 UE354" bgcolor=#fefefe
| – ||  || MBA-I || 19.1 || data-sort-value="0.45" | 450 m || single || 4 days || 23 Oct 2003 || 6 || align=left | — || 
|- id="2003 UL354" bgcolor=#E9E9E9
| 0 ||  || MBA-M || 17.6 || data-sort-value="0.90" | 900 m || multiple || 1995–2019 || 23 Oct 2019 || 64 || align=left | Alt.: 2006 HJ117 || 
|- id="2003 UN354" bgcolor=#E9E9E9
| – ||  || MBA-M || 19.2 || data-sort-value="0.43" | 430 m || single || 23 days || 23 Oct 2003 || 8 || align=left | — || 
|- id="2003 UR354" bgcolor=#d6d6d6
| 0 ||  || MBA-O || 17.12 || 2.1 km || multiple || 2003–2021 || 08 Aug 2021 || 127 || align=left | — || 
|- id="2003 UV354" bgcolor=#fefefe
| 0 ||  || HUN || 18.7 || data-sort-value="0.54" | 540 m || multiple || 2003–2021 || 16 Jan 2021 || 59 || align=left | Alt.: 2013 GV133 || 
|- id="2003 UX354" bgcolor=#fefefe
| 0 ||  || MBA-I || 18.96 || data-sort-value="0.48" | 480 m || multiple || 2003–2021 || 29 Oct 2021 || 66 || align=left | Alt.: 2014 WQ92 || 
|- id="2003 UB355" bgcolor=#d6d6d6
| 0 ||  || MBA-O || 16.99 || 2.2 km || multiple || 1998–2021 || 08 Aug 2021 || 128 || align=left | — || 
|- id="2003 UC355" bgcolor=#d6d6d6
| 0 ||  || MBA-O || 17.66 || 1.6 km || multiple || 2003–2021 || 09 Apr 2021 || 64 || align=left | — || 
|- id="2003 UD355" bgcolor=#d6d6d6
| 0 ||  || MBA-O || 17.1 || 2.1 km || multiple || 2003–2019 || 27 Oct 2019 || 60 || align=left | — || 
|- id="2003 UG355" bgcolor=#E9E9E9
| 0 ||  || MBA-M || 18.12 || 1.3 km || multiple || 2003–2021 || 10 Aug 2021 || 38 || align=left | — || 
|- id="2003 UN355" bgcolor=#d6d6d6
| 0 ||  || MBA-O || 17.4 || 1.8 km || multiple || 2003–2021 || 06 Jan 2021 || 77 || align=left | Alt.: 2014 QL394, 2016 AM141 || 
|- id="2003 US355" bgcolor=#fefefe
| 0 ||  || MBA-I || 17.5 || data-sort-value="0.94" | 940 m || multiple || 2003–2020 || 24 Mar 2020 || 113 || align=left | Alt.: 2011 YA36 || 
|- id="2003 UY355" bgcolor=#d6d6d6
| 0 ||  || MBA-O || 17.1 || 2.1 km || multiple || 2003–2019 || 27 Oct 2019 || 76 || align=left | Alt.: 2014 UO148 || 
|- id="2003 UD356" bgcolor=#d6d6d6
| 0 ||  || MBA-O || 17.53 || 1.7 km || multiple || 2003–2021 || 02 Apr 2021 || 57 || align=left | Alt.: 2016 FC16 || 
|- id="2003 UK356" bgcolor=#E9E9E9
| 0 ||  || MBA-M || 17.71 || 1.6 km || multiple || 2003–2021 || 24 Oct 2021 || 59 || align=left | Disc.: SpacewatchAdded on 30 September 2021Alt.: 2014 DS188 || 
|- id="2003 UM356" bgcolor=#d6d6d6
| 0 ||  || MBA-O || 16.7 || 2.5 km || multiple || 2003–2021 || 07 Jan 2021 || 102 || align=left | Alt.: 2014 WA281 || 
|- id="2003 UN356" bgcolor=#fefefe
| 3 ||  || MBA-I || 19.3 || data-sort-value="0.41" | 410 m || multiple || 2003–2021 || 07 Nov 2021 || 30 || align=left | Disc.: SpacewatchAdded on 24 December 2021 || 
|- id="2003 UQ356" bgcolor=#E9E9E9
| 0 ||  || MBA-M || 18.03 || 1.0 km || multiple || 2003–2022 || 25 Jan 2022 || 51 || align=left | Disc.: SpacewatchAdded on 17 January 2021 || 
|- id="2003 UR356" bgcolor=#E9E9E9
| 0 ||  || MBA-M || 19.37 || data-sort-value="0.56" | 560 m || multiple || 2003–2020 || 14 Dec 2020 || 72 || align=left | Disc.: SpacewatchAdded on 17 January 2021 || 
|- id="2003 UV356" bgcolor=#fefefe
| 1 ||  || MBA-I || 18.3 || data-sort-value="0.65" | 650 m || multiple || 2003–2019 || 31 May 2019 || 61 || align=left | — || 
|- id="2003 UC357" bgcolor=#E9E9E9
| 2 ||  || MBA-M || 17.4 || data-sort-value="0.98" | 980 m || multiple || 1997–2021 || 18 Jan 2021 || 85 || align=left | — || 
|- id="2003 UL357" bgcolor=#d6d6d6
| 0 ||  || MBA-O || 17.0 || 2.2 km || multiple || 2003–2020 || 10 Dec 2020 || 80 || align=left | Alt.: 2008 SE87, 2014 UC79 || 
|- id="2003 UM357" bgcolor=#fefefe
| 0 ||  || MBA-I || 18.4 || data-sort-value="0.62" | 620 m || multiple || 2003–2020 || 23 Dec 2020 || 79 || align=left | Alt.: 2015 FO233 || 
|- id="2003 UR357" bgcolor=#E9E9E9
| 4 ||  || MBA-M || 19.3 || data-sort-value="0.58" | 580 m || multiple || 2003–2020 || 10 Dec 2020 || 18 || align=left | Disc.: SpacewatchAdded on 11 May 2021 || 
|- id="2003 UX357" bgcolor=#fefefe
| 0 ||  || HUN || 18.86 || data-sort-value="0.50" | 500 m || multiple || 2003–2021 || 07 Jul 2021 || 135 || align=left | Alt.: 2010 GC33 || 
|- id="2003 UA358" bgcolor=#d6d6d6
| 3 ||  || MBA-O || 17.3 || 1.9 km || multiple || 2003–2019 || 27 Oct 2019 || 42 || align=left | — || 
|- id="2003 UE358" bgcolor=#fefefe
| 0 ||  || MBA-I || 17.8 || data-sort-value="0.82" | 820 m || multiple || 2003–2020 || 16 Jun 2020 || 129 || align=left | — || 
|- id="2003 UG358" bgcolor=#E9E9E9
| 0 ||  || MBA-M || 17.5 || data-sort-value="0.94" | 940 m || multiple || 2003–2021 || 06 Jan 2021 || 90 || align=left | — || 
|- id="2003 UH358" bgcolor=#d6d6d6
| 0 ||  || MBA-O || 17.02 || 2.2 km || multiple || 2003–2021 || 13 May 2021 || 77 || align=left | Alt.: 2013 SZ1 || 
|- id="2003 UK358" bgcolor=#d6d6d6
| 0 ||  || HIL || 16.0 || 3.5 km || multiple || 2003–2021 || 16 Jan 2021 || 66 || align=left | Alt.: 2011 WS172, 2019 TK32 || 
|- id="2003 UL358" bgcolor=#d6d6d6
| 0 ||  || MBA-O || 16.4 || 2.9 km || multiple || 2003–2020 || 21 Jan 2020 || 100 || align=left | Alt.: 2017 HV15 || 
|- id="2003 UM358" bgcolor=#d6d6d6
| 1 ||  || MBA-O || 16.9 || 2.3 km || multiple || 2003–2018 || 13 Apr 2018 || 38 || align=left | Alt.: 2014 TJ39 || 
|- id="2003 UN358" bgcolor=#E9E9E9
| 0 ||  || MBA-M || 18.0 || data-sort-value="0.75" | 750 m || multiple || 2003–2021 || 12 Jan 2021 || 64 || align=left | — || 
|- id="2003 UP358" bgcolor=#E9E9E9
| 1 ||  || MBA-M || 17.3 || 1.0 km || multiple || 2003–2020 || 15 Dec 2020 || 49 || align=left | — || 
|- id="2003 UZ358" bgcolor=#E9E9E9
| 1 ||  || MBA-M || 18.2 || data-sort-value="0.96" | 960 m || multiple || 2003–2020 || 14 Oct 2020 || 41 || align=left | Disc.: SpacewatchAdded on 17 January 2021 || 
|- id="2003 UG359" bgcolor=#fefefe
| 0 ||  || MBA-I || 18.68 || data-sort-value="0.55" | 550 m || multiple || 2003–2021 || 30 Nov 2021 || 87 || align=left | — || 
|- id="2003 UH359" bgcolor=#fefefe
| 0 ||  || MBA-I || 18.20 || data-sort-value="0.68" | 680 m || multiple || 2003–2021 || 08 May 2021 || 48 || align=left | Alt.: 2007 UG101 || 
|- id="2003 US359" bgcolor=#d6d6d6
| 0 ||  || MBA-O || 16.95 || 2.3 km || multiple || 2003–2021 || 13 May 2021 || 132 || align=left | Alt.: 2010 GT180 || 
|- id="2003 UU359" bgcolor=#d6d6d6
| 1 ||  || MBA-O || 17.7 || 1.6 km || multiple || 2003–2019 || 01 Nov 2019 || 29 || align=left | Disc.: LPL/Spacewatch IIAdded on 19 October 2020 || 
|- id="2003 UW359" bgcolor=#d6d6d6
| 0 ||  || MBA-O || 17.4 || 1.8 km || multiple || 2003–2021 || 16 Jan 2021 || 65 || align=left | — || 
|- id="2003 UX359" bgcolor=#fefefe
| 0 ||  || MBA-I || 18.7 || data-sort-value="0.54" | 540 m || multiple || 2003–2020 || 11 Dec 2020 || 64 || align=left | — || 
|- id="2003 UN360" bgcolor=#d6d6d6
| 0 ||  || MBA-O || 16.44 || 2.9 km || multiple || 2003–2021 || 17 Apr 2021 || 171 || align=left | Alt.: 2014 WH388 || 
|- id="2003 UQ360" bgcolor=#d6d6d6
| 0 ||  || MBA-O || 16.5 || 2.8 km || multiple || 1998–2019 || 02 Nov 2019 || 124 || align=left | Alt.: 2014 WY146 || 
|- id="2003 UU360" bgcolor=#E9E9E9
| 0 ||  || MBA-M || 18.0 || 1.1 km || multiple || 2003–2020 || 07 Dec 2020 || 112 || align=left | — || 
|- id="2003 UZ360" bgcolor=#d6d6d6
| 0 ||  || MBA-O || 16.98 || 2.2 km || multiple || 2003–2021 || 15 Apr 2021 || 86 || align=left | — || 
|- id="2003 UL361" bgcolor=#d6d6d6
| – ||  || HIL || 17.4 || 1.8 km || single || 3 days || 23 Oct 2003 || 7 || align=left | — || 
|- id="2003 UM361" bgcolor=#E9E9E9
| – ||  || MBA-M || 18.9 || data-sort-value="0.70" | 700 m || single || 4 days || 24 Oct 2003 || 9 || align=left | — || 
|- id="2003 UP361" bgcolor=#fefefe
| 0 ||  || MBA-I || 19.05 || data-sort-value="0.46" | 460 m || multiple || 2003–2022 || 25 Jan 2022 || 36 || align=left | — || 
|- id="2003 UT361" bgcolor=#d6d6d6
| 1 ||  || MBA-O || 17.5 || 1.8 km || multiple || 2003–2020 || 17 Dec 2020 || 26 || align=left | — || 
|- id="2003 UW361" bgcolor=#E9E9E9
| 0 ||  || MBA-M || 17.1 || 1.6 km || multiple || 2003–2021 || 06 Jan 2021 || 153 || align=left | Alt.: 2014 HL8 || 
|- id="2003 UX361" bgcolor=#E9E9E9
| 0 ||  || MBA-M || 17.91 || 1.5 km || multiple || 2003–2021 || 08 Sep 2021 || 54 || align=left | Alt.: 2015 FJ234 || 
|- id="2003 UY361" bgcolor=#E9E9E9
| 0 ||  || MBA-M || 17.9 || 1.1 km || multiple || 2003–2021 || 06 Jan 2021 || 69 || align=left | Alt.: 2016 UE254 || 
|- id="2003 UZ361" bgcolor=#fefefe
| – ||  || MBA-I || 20.2 || data-sort-value="0.27" | 270 m || single || 3 days || 23 Oct 2003 || 7 || align=left | — || 
|- id="2003 UA362" bgcolor=#d6d6d6
| – ||  || MBA-O || 17.2 || 2.0 km || single || 4 days || 24 Oct 2003 || 7 || align=left | — || 
|- id="2003 UB362" bgcolor=#E9E9E9
| 2 ||  || MBA-M || 18.1 || 1.0 km || multiple || 2003–2020 || 11 Dec 2020 || 37 || align=left | Disc.: SpacewatchAdded on 17 January 2021 || 
|- id="2003 UJ362" bgcolor=#E9E9E9
| 0 ||  || MBA-M || 17.8 || 1.2 km || multiple || 2003–2020 || 14 Sep 2020 || 34 || align=left | — || 
|- id="2003 UN362" bgcolor=#E9E9E9
| 2 ||  || MBA-M || 18.1 || 1.3 km || multiple || 2003–2017 || 14 Sep 2017 || 21 || align=left | — || 
|- id="2003 UO362" bgcolor=#E9E9E9
| 0 ||  || MBA-M || 17.7 || data-sort-value="0.86" | 860 m || multiple || 2003–2019 || 03 Oct 2019 || 47 || align=left | Alt.: 2014 HF170 || 
|- id="2003 UQ362" bgcolor=#d6d6d6
| 1 ||  || MBA-O || 16.7 || 2.5 km || multiple || 2003–2021 || 05 Jan 2021 || 92 || align=left | Alt.: 2014 QM306 || 
|- id="2003 UR362" bgcolor=#d6d6d6
| 0 ||  || MBA-O || 17.3 || 1.9 km || multiple || 1998–2019 || 08 Nov 2019 || 66 || align=left | Alt.: 2014 WZ125, 2014 WJ483 || 
|- id="2003 UV362" bgcolor=#E9E9E9
| 0 ||  || MBA-M || 17.48 || 1.8 km || multiple || 2001–2021 || 10 Nov 2021 || 71 || align=left | Disc.: SpacewatchAdded on 21 August 2021Alt.: 2008 XM68 || 
|- id="2003 UA363" bgcolor=#E9E9E9
| 2 ||  || MBA-M || 18.5 || data-sort-value="0.59" | 590 m || multiple || 2003–2019 || 09 Jul 2019 || 33 || align=left | Alt.: 2015 MT113 || 
|- id="2003 UE363" bgcolor=#fefefe
| – ||  || MBA-I || 18.8 || data-sort-value="0.52" | 520 m || single || 3 days || 23 Oct 2003 || 7 || align=left | — || 
|- id="2003 UF363" bgcolor=#E9E9E9
| 0 ||  || MBA-M || 18.0 || 1.1 km || multiple || 2003–2020 || 10 Nov 2020 || 52 || align=left | Alt.: 2015 KJ106 || 
|- id="2003 UH363" bgcolor=#E9E9E9
| 0 ||  || MBA-M || 17.6 || 1.7 km || multiple || 2003–2017 || 25 Oct 2017 || 38 || align=left | — || 
|- id="2003 UK363" bgcolor=#E9E9E9
| 0 ||  || MBA-M || 17.54 || 1.7 km || multiple || 1996–2021 || 10 Nov 2021 || 75 || align=left | — || 
|- id="2003 UM363" bgcolor=#E9E9E9
| 1 ||  || MBA-M || 19.0 || data-sort-value="0.67" | 670 m || multiple || 2003–2020 || 15 Sep 2020 || 26 || align=left | — || 
|- id="2003 UO363" bgcolor=#d6d6d6
| 0 ||  || MBA-O || 17.20 || 2.0 km || multiple || 2003–2021 || 14 Apr 2021 || 59 || align=left | — || 
|- id="2003 UR363" bgcolor=#d6d6d6
| 0 ||  || MBA-O || 17.5 || 1.8 km || multiple || 1998–2019 || 28 Dec 2019 || 38 || align=left | Alt.: 2008 SK230 || 
|- id="2003 US363" bgcolor=#E9E9E9
| 0 ||  || MBA-M || 17.04 || 2.2 km || multiple || 1997–2021 || 27 Nov 2021 || 170 || align=left | Alt.: 2006 HX106 || 
|- id="2003 UT363" bgcolor=#fefefe
| 0 ||  || MBA-I || 18.1 || data-sort-value="0.71" | 710 m || multiple || 2000–2019 || 30 Jun 2019 || 98 || align=left | — || 
|- id="2003 UF364" bgcolor=#fefefe
| 1 ||  || MBA-I || 19.0 || data-sort-value="0.47" | 470 m || multiple || 2003–2020 || 23 Aug 2020 || 70 || align=left | — || 
|- id="2003 UH364" bgcolor=#E9E9E9
| 0 ||  || MBA-M || 17.6 || 1.3 km || multiple || 2003–2020 || 20 Oct 2020 || 85 || align=left | Alt.: 2016 UU106 || 
|- id="2003 UJ364" bgcolor=#fefefe
| 0 ||  || MBA-I || 17.5 || data-sort-value="0.94" | 940 m || multiple || 2003–2019 || 27 Nov 2019 || 65 || align=left | Alt.: 2015 TG161 || 
|- id="2003 UK364" bgcolor=#E9E9E9
| 0 ||  || MBA-M || 17.65 || 1.2 km || multiple || 1998–2020 || 08 Oct 2020 || 71 || align=left | Alt.: 2015 KD123 || 
|- id="2003 UN364" bgcolor=#fefefe
| 1 ||  || MBA-I || 19.2 || data-sort-value="0.43" | 430 m || multiple || 2003–2020 || 13 Sep 2020 || 30 || align=left | Disc.: SpacewatchAdded on 17 June 2021Alt.: 2020 PM31 || 
|- id="2003 UO364" bgcolor=#d6d6d6
| 0 ||  || MBA-O || 16.6 || 2.7 km || multiple || 2003–2021 || 10 Jan 2021 || 115 || align=left | — || 
|- id="2003 UP364" bgcolor=#E9E9E9
| 0 ||  || MBA-M || 18.1 || 1.0 km || multiple || 1999–2020 || 23 Aug 2020 || 38 || align=left | — || 
|- id="2003 UQ364" bgcolor=#d6d6d6
| 0 ||  || MBA-O || 17.3 || 1.9 km || multiple || 2003–2021 || 17 Jan 2021 || 52 || align=left | — || 
|- id="2003 UR364" bgcolor=#fefefe
| 2 ||  || MBA-I || 19.09 || data-sort-value="0.45" | 450 m || multiple || 2003–2021 || 29 Oct 2021 || 36 || align=left | Alt.: 2021 SW26 || 
|- id="2003 UV364" bgcolor=#fefefe
| 0 ||  || MBA-I || 18.24 || data-sort-value="0.67" | 670 m || multiple || 2003–2021 || 11 Sep 2021 || 51 || align=left | — || 
|- id="2003 UZ364" bgcolor=#d6d6d6
| 0 ||  || MBA-O || 16.30 || 3.1 km || multiple || 2001–2022 || 07 Jan 2022 || 215 || align=left | Alt.: 2001 FD239 || 
|- id="2003 UF365" bgcolor=#E9E9E9
| 0 ||  || MBA-M || 18.26 || 1.2 km || multiple || 2003–2021 || 24 Nov 2021 || 51 || align=left | Disc.: SpacewatchAdded on 5 November 2021 || 
|- id="2003 UL365" bgcolor=#E9E9E9
| 0 ||  || MBA-M || 17.46 || 1.4 km || multiple || 2003–2022 || 27 Jan 2022 || 173 || align=left | — || 
|- id="2003 UM365" bgcolor=#d6d6d6
| 0 ||  || MBA-O || 16.90 || 2.3 km || multiple || 2003–2021 || 09 May 2021 || 73 || align=left | Alt.: 2010 GU182, 2016 GS91 || 
|- id="2003 UN365" bgcolor=#E9E9E9
| 0 ||  || MBA-M || 18.0 || 1.1 km || multiple || 2003–2020 || 14 Oct 2020 || 43 || align=left | Alt.: 2009 DK76 || 
|- id="2003 UP365" bgcolor=#fefefe
| 0 ||  || MBA-I || 18.86 || data-sort-value="0.50" | 500 m || multiple || 2003–2022 || 27 Jan 2022 || 53 || align=left | Alt.: 2003 UA442 || 
|- id="2003 US365" bgcolor=#E9E9E9
| 0 ||  || MBA-M || 17.5 || 1.3 km || multiple || 2003–2020 || 13 Sep 2020 || 66 || align=left | Alt.: 2016 SB43 || 
|- id="2003 UU365" bgcolor=#E9E9E9
| 0 ||  || MBA-M || 17.9 || 1.1 km || multiple || 2003–2020 || 10 Dec 2020 || 63 || align=left | Alt.: 2010 JZ114 || 
|- id="2003 UZ365" bgcolor=#E9E9E9
| 0 ||  || MBA-M || 18.4 || data-sort-value="0.88" | 880 m || multiple || 2003–2020 || 19 Nov 2020 || 36 || align=left | Alt.: 2007 RZ115 || 
|- id="2003 UB366" bgcolor=#d6d6d6
| 0 ||  || MBA-O || 16.30 || 3.1 km || multiple || 2003–2021 || 06 Dec 2021 || 89 || align=left | Alt.: 2010 DR32 || 
|- id="2003 UG366" bgcolor=#d6d6d6
| 0 ||  || MBA-O || 16.90 || 2.3 km || multiple || 2003–2022 || 10 Jan 2022 || 87 || align=left | Alt.: 2016 AO156 || 
|- id="2003 UV366" bgcolor=#fefefe
| 4 ||  || MBA-I || 19.4 || data-sort-value="0.39" | 390 m || multiple || 2001–2003 || 15 Nov 2003 || 15 || align=left | Alt.: 2001 FT239 || 
|- id="2003 UW366" bgcolor=#d6d6d6
| 0 ||  || MBA-O || 17.1 || 2.1 km || multiple || 2003–2019 || 26 Oct 2019 || 48 || align=left | — || 
|- id="2003 UN367" bgcolor=#E9E9E9
| 1 ||  || MBA-M || 18.4 || data-sort-value="0.62" | 620 m || multiple || 2003–2021 || 07 Feb 2021 || 19 || align=left | Disc.: SpacewatchAdded on 5 November 2021 || 
|- id="2003 UO367" bgcolor=#E9E9E9
| 0 ||  || MBA-M || 17.4 || data-sort-value="0.98" | 980 m || multiple || 2003–2021 || 16 Jan 2021 || 92 || align=left | Disc.: SpacewatchAdded on 17 January 2021Alt.: 2017 BQ119 || 
|- id="2003 UQ367" bgcolor=#fefefe
| 0 ||  || MBA-I || 18.33 || data-sort-value="0.64" | 640 m || multiple || 1992–2021 || 31 Aug 2021 || 55 || align=left | — || 
|- id="2003 UV367" bgcolor=#E9E9E9
| 1 ||  || MBA-M || 18.2 || data-sort-value="0.96" | 960 m || multiple || 2003–2020 || 17 Sep 2020 || 36 || align=left | Disc.: SpacewatchAdded on 17 January 2021Alt.: 2016 TL142 || 
|- id="2003 UD368" bgcolor=#fefefe
| 0 ||  || MBA-I || 18.3 || data-sort-value="0.65" | 650 m || multiple || 2003–2020 || 20 Jul 2020 || 71 || align=left | Alt.: 2016 GA176 || 
|- id="2003 UF368" bgcolor=#d6d6d6
| 0 ||  || MBA-O || 16.8 || 2.4 km || multiple || 2003–2019 || 07 Sep 2019 || 65 || align=left | Alt.: 2005 EX210, 2010 ED115, 2014 WV318 || 
|- id="2003 US368" bgcolor=#d6d6d6
| 0 ||  || MBA-O || 16.28 || 3.1 km || multiple || 2003–2022 || 27 Jan 2022 || 89 || align=left | Alt.: 2014 WD212 || 
|- id="2003 UF369" bgcolor=#fefefe
| 0 ||  || MBA-I || 17.3 || 1.0 km || multiple || 2001–2021 || 18 Jan 2021 || 178 || align=left | Alt.: 2013 WN68 || 
|- id="2003 UN369" bgcolor=#fefefe
| 0 ||  || MBA-I || 18.1 || data-sort-value="0.71" | 710 m || multiple || 2003–2020 || 16 Dec 2020 || 76 || align=left | — || 
|- id="2003 UT369" bgcolor=#fefefe
| 2 ||  || MBA-I || 19.08 || data-sort-value="0.45" | 450 m || multiple || 2003–2017 || 10 Nov 2017 || 21 || align=left | — || 
|- id="2003 UU369" bgcolor=#E9E9E9
| 0 ||  || MBA-M || 17.25 || 2.0 km || multiple || 2003–2021 || 26 Oct 2021 || 152 || align=left | — || 
|- id="2003 UV369" bgcolor=#E9E9E9
| 0 ||  || MBA-M || 17.8 || 1.2 km || multiple || 2003–2020 || 10 Oct 2020 || 37 || align=left | Disc.: LPL/Spacewatch IIAdded on 17 January 2021 || 
|- id="2003 UW369" bgcolor=#d6d6d6
| – ||  || MBA-O || 18.7 || 1.0 km || single || 3 days || 24 Oct 2003 || 7 || align=left | — || 
|- id="2003 UA370" bgcolor=#d6d6d6
| 0 ||  || MBA-O || 16.0 || 3.5 km || multiple || 2003–2021 || 17 Jan 2021 || 171 || align=left | Alt.: 2010 FW42, 2014 WE475, 2016 CN63 || 
|- id="2003 UC370" bgcolor=#fefefe
| 0 ||  || MBA-I || 18.64 || data-sort-value="0.56" | 560 m || multiple || 2003–2021 || 07 Apr 2021 || 85 || align=left | Alt.: 2005 EL307, 2006 SJ68 || 
|- id="2003 UO370" bgcolor=#fefefe
| 0 ||  || MBA-I || 19.2 || data-sort-value="0.43" | 430 m || multiple || 2003–2020 || 16 Dec 2020 || 42 || align=left | Disc.: SpacewatchAdded on 9 March 2021 || 
|- id="2003 UT370" bgcolor=#fefefe
| 0 ||  || MBA-I || 18.36 || data-sort-value="0.63" | 630 m || multiple || 2003–2021 || 31 Mar 2021 || 135 || align=left | Alt.: 2013 YA7, 2016 SO34 || 
|- id="2003 UV370" bgcolor=#d6d6d6
| 0 ||  || MBA-O || 16.5 || 2.8 km || multiple || 2003–2020 || 11 Dec 2020 || 104 || align=left | Alt.: 2013 JU4 || 
|- id="2003 UZ370" bgcolor=#E9E9E9
| 0 ||  || MBA-M || 17.8 || 1.2 km || multiple || 2003–2020 || 16 Jun 2020 || 39 || align=left | — || 
|- id="2003 UB371" bgcolor=#E9E9E9
| 1 ||  || MBA-M || 17.2 || 1.1 km || multiple || 2003–2019 || 06 Jul 2019 || 73 || align=left | — || 
|- id="2003 UG371" bgcolor=#E9E9E9
| 0 ||  || MBA-M || 16.85 || 1.8 km || multiple || 2003–2022 || 05 Jan 2022 || 162 || align=left | — || 
|- id="2003 UK371" bgcolor=#E9E9E9
| 0 ||  || MBA-M || 17.5 || data-sort-value="0.94" | 940 m || multiple || 2003–2020 || 10 Dec 2020 || 58 || align=left | — || 
|- id="2003 UM371" bgcolor=#E9E9E9
| 0 ||  || MBA-M || 17.4 || 1.8 km || multiple || 2003–2017 || 09 Dec 2017 || 55 || align=left | — || 
|- id="2003 UW371" bgcolor=#E9E9E9
| 0 ||  || MBA-M || 17.5 || 1.3 km || multiple || 1994–2020 || 17 Oct 2020 || 192 || align=left | Alt.: 2003 OW7, 2011 GW59 || 
|- id="2003 UA372" bgcolor=#E9E9E9
| 0 ||  || MBA-M || 18.06 || 1.0 km || multiple || 2003–2021 || 30 Nov 2021 || 59 || align=left | — || 
|- id="2003 UE372" bgcolor=#d6d6d6
| 0 ||  || MBA-O || 16.9 || 2.3 km || multiple || 2003–2020 || 23 Nov 2020 || 49 || align=left | — || 
|- id="2003 UL372" bgcolor=#d6d6d6
| 0 ||  || MBA-O || 17.4 || 1.8 km || multiple || 2003–2019 || 03 Dec 2019 || 38 || align=left | — || 
|- id="2003 US372" bgcolor=#fefefe
| 1 ||  || MBA-I || 18.0 || data-sort-value="0.75" | 750 m || multiple || 2003–2020 || 01 Jan 2020 || 26 || align=left | — || 
|- id="2003 UB373" bgcolor=#d6d6d6
| 0 ||  || MBA-O || 16.4 || 2.9 km || multiple || 2003–2019 || 05 Nov 2019 || 93 || align=left | — || 
|- id="2003 UK373" bgcolor=#d6d6d6
| 0 ||  || MBA-O || 18.2 || 1.3 km || multiple || 2003–2017 || 19 May 2017 || 33 || align=left | — || 
|- id="2003 UN373" bgcolor=#E9E9E9
| 0 ||  || MBA-M || 17.03 || 2.6 km || multiple || 2003–2022 || 27 Jan 2022 || 122 || align=left | Alt.: 2010 MH106 || 
|- id="2003 UP373" bgcolor=#fefefe
| 2 ||  || MBA-I || 19.4 || data-sort-value="0.39" | 390 m || multiple || 2003–2019 || 03 Dec 2019 || 28 || align=left | — || 
|- id="2003 UQ373" bgcolor=#d6d6d6
| 1 ||  || MBA-O || 16.8 || 2.4 km || multiple || 2003–2021 || 04 Jan 2021 || 85 || align=left | — || 
|- id="2003 UT373" bgcolor=#fefefe
| 0 ||  || MBA-I || 18.29 || data-sort-value="0.65" | 650 m || multiple || 2003–2021 || 30 Nov 2021 || 146 || align=left | Alt.: 2014 WY205 || 
|- id="2003 UA374" bgcolor=#E9E9E9
| 0 ||  || MBA-M || 17.6 || data-sort-value="0.90" | 900 m || multiple || 2003–2021 || 07 Feb 2021 || 60 || align=left | — || 
|- id="2003 UE374" bgcolor=#E9E9E9
| 0 ||  || MBA-M || 17.64 || 1.7 km || multiple || 2003–2021 || 08 Nov 2021 || 83 || align=left | — || 
|- id="2003 UF374" bgcolor=#E9E9E9
| 1 ||  || MBA-M || 18.6 || data-sort-value="0.57" | 570 m || multiple || 2003–2021 || 16 Jan 2021 || 53 || align=left | Disc.: SDSSAdded on 17 January 2021 || 
|- id="2003 UG374" bgcolor=#fefefe
| 0 ||  || MBA-I || 19.0 || data-sort-value="0.47" | 470 m || multiple || 2003–2018 || 14 Sep 2018 || 35 || align=left | Alt.: 2007 UB121 || 
|- id="2003 UM374" bgcolor=#E9E9E9
| 0 ||  || MBA-M || 17.9 || 1.1 km || multiple || 2003–2021 || 13 Jan 2021 || 75 || align=left | — || 
|- id="2003 UN374" bgcolor=#d6d6d6
| 0 ||  || MBA-O || 16.7 || 2.5 km || multiple || 2003–2020 || 10 Nov 2020 || 57 || align=left | Alt.: 2014 OO384 || 
|- id="2003 UU374" bgcolor=#d6d6d6
| 0 ||  || MBA-O || 16.5 || 2.8 km || multiple || 2003–2021 || 17 Jan 2021 || 125 || align=left | Alt.: 2016 CX208 || 
|- id="2003 UD375" bgcolor=#fefefe
| 0 ||  || MBA-I || 18.6 || data-sort-value="0.57" | 570 m || multiple || 2003–2021 || 04 Oct 2021 || 88 || align=left | — || 
|- id="2003 UE375" bgcolor=#d6d6d6
| 0 ||  || MBA-O || 16.6 || 2.7 km || multiple || 2003–2020 || 12 Dec 2020 || 82 || align=left | Alt.: 2003 SE367, 2014 UT123, 2017 CR12 || 
|- id="2003 UL375" bgcolor=#fefefe
| 0 ||  || MBA-I || 18.3 || data-sort-value="0.65" | 650 m || multiple || 2003–2021 || 22 Jan 2021 || 109 || align=left | — || 
|- id="2003 UM375" bgcolor=#fefefe
| 0 ||  || MBA-I || 19.0 || data-sort-value="0.47" | 470 m || multiple || 2003–2020 || 17 Nov 2020 || 52 || align=left | — || 
|- id="2003 UN375" bgcolor=#d6d6d6
| 0 ||  || MBA-O || 17.10 || 2.1 km || multiple || 2002–2021 || 17 Apr 2021 || 82 || align=left | Alt.: 2016 EU191 || 
|- id="2003 US375" bgcolor=#E9E9E9
| 0 ||  || MBA-M || 17.7 || 1.6 km || multiple || 1994–2017 || 10 Nov 2017 || 35 || align=left | — || 
|- id="2003 UT375" bgcolor=#FA8072
| 1 ||  || MCA || 20.4 || data-sort-value="0.25" | 250 m || multiple || 2003–2017 || 13 Dec 2017 || 59 || align=left | Alt.: 2010 RS110, 2010 TL29 || 
|- id="2003 UY375" bgcolor=#fefefe
| 0 ||  || MBA-I || 18.43 || data-sort-value="0.61" | 610 m || multiple || 2003–2021 || 27 Oct 2021 || 108 || align=left | — || 
|- id="2003 UD376" bgcolor=#fefefe
| 2 ||  || MBA-I || 18.7 || data-sort-value="0.54" | 540 m || multiple || 2003–2019 || 27 May 2019 || 36 || align=left | Alt.: 2009 HA35 || 
|- id="2003 UH376" bgcolor=#d6d6d6
| 1 ||  || MBA-O || 17.03 || 2.2 km || multiple || 2003–2022 || 26 Jan 2022 || 24 || align=left | Alt.: 2014 SD228 || 
|- id="2003 UK376" bgcolor=#fefefe
| 2 ||  || MBA-I || 19.3 || data-sort-value="0.41" | 410 m || multiple || 2003–2016 || 26 Sep 2016 || 35 || align=left | Alt.: 2016 QQ51 || 
|- id="2003 UN376" bgcolor=#E9E9E9
| 0 ||  || MBA-M || 18.0 || 1.1 km || multiple || 1999–2020 || 17 Oct 2020 || 112 || align=left | — || 
|- id="2003 UQ376" bgcolor=#E9E9E9
| 3 ||  || MBA-M || 18.5 || data-sort-value="0.84" | 840 m || multiple || 2003–2020 || 13 Aug 2020 || 27 || align=left | Disc.: SDSSAdded on 22 July 2020 || 
|- id="2003 UY376" bgcolor=#d6d6d6
| 0 ||  || MBA-O || 15.9 || 3.7 km || multiple || 2003–2021 || 16 Jan 2021 || 121 || align=left | Alt.: 2006 DF18 || 
|- id="2003 UC377" bgcolor=#d6d6d6
| 0 ||  || MBA-O || 17.25 || 2.0 km || multiple || 1998–2021 || 15 Apr 2021 || 86 || align=left | Alt.: 2016 EM163, 2018 VO101 || 
|- id="2003 UH377" bgcolor=#E9E9E9
| 0 ||  || MBA-M || 17.13 || 2.1 km || multiple || 2003–2021 || 09 Dec 2021 || 159 || align=left | Alt.: 2012 SM26 || 
|- id="2003 UL377" bgcolor=#fefefe
| 0 ||  || MBA-I || 18.48 || data-sort-value="0.60" | 600 m || multiple || 2003–2021 || 27 Nov 2021 || 78 || align=left | Alt.: 2014 UL93 || 
|- id="2003 UQ377" bgcolor=#d6d6d6
| – ||  || MBA-O || 17.9 || 1.5 km || single || 5 days || 23 Oct 2003 || 6 || align=left | — || 
|- id="2003 UX377" bgcolor=#d6d6d6
| 0 ||  || MBA-O || 16.76 || 2.5 km || multiple || 2003–2020 || 06 Dec 2020 || 122 || align=left | — || 
|- id="2003 UY377" bgcolor=#d6d6d6
| 0 ||  || MBA-O || 16.8 || 2.4 km || multiple || 2003–2021 || 08 Jan 2021 || 149 || align=left | Alt.: 2009 WF244, 2011 FK136 || 
|- id="2003 UD378" bgcolor=#d6d6d6
| 0 ||  || MBA-O || 16.36 || 3.0 km || multiple || 2003–2021 || 09 Apr 2021 || 162 || align=left | Alt.: 2012 LF20, 2015 AE23 || 
|- id="2003 UE378" bgcolor=#fefefe
| 3 ||  || MBA-I || 18.9 || data-sort-value="0.49" | 490 m || multiple || 2003–2014 || 25 Oct 2014 || 32 || align=left | Alt.: 2014 SQ274 || 
|- id="2003 UM378" bgcolor=#fefefe
| 1 ||  || MBA-I || 18.4 || data-sort-value="0.62" | 620 m || multiple || 2003–2020 || 21 Jun 2020 || 59 || align=left | — || 
|- id="2003 UN378" bgcolor=#d6d6d6
| 0 ||  || HIL || 16.7 || 2.5 km || multiple || 2003–2020 || 23 Dec 2020 || 57 || align=left | — || 
|- id="2003 UR378" bgcolor=#d6d6d6
| 3 ||  || MBA-O || 18.3 || 1.2 km || multiple || 2003–2020 || 14 Sep 2020 || 18 || align=left | Disc.: SDSSAdded on 11 May 2021Alt.: 2020 QK70 || 
|- id="2003 UW378" bgcolor=#d6d6d6
| 0 ||  || MBA-O || 16.7 || 2.5 km || multiple || 2003–2021 || 04 Jan 2021 || 79 || align=left | Alt.: 2003 UK338, 2006 HF145 || 
|- id="2003 UX378" bgcolor=#fefefe
| 0 ||  || MBA-I || 18.6 || data-sort-value="0.57" | 570 m || multiple || 2003–2020 || 22 Jan 2020 || 41 || align=left | Alt.: 2007 TR382 || 
|- id="2003 UA379" bgcolor=#d6d6d6
| 0 ||  || MBA-O || 16.1 || 3.4 km || multiple || 2001–2021 || 18 Jan 2021 || 275 || align=left | Alt.: 2011 EV10, 2014 WG50 || 
|- id="2003 UC379" bgcolor=#fefefe
| 0 ||  || MBA-I || 18.69 || data-sort-value="0.54" | 540 m || multiple || 2003–2022 || 26 Jan 2022 || 86 || align=left | Alt.: 2010 UG90, 2015 BW261 || 
|- id="2003 UE379" bgcolor=#d6d6d6
| 0 ||  || MBA-O || 17.5 || 1.8 km || multiple || 2003–2021 || 15 Jan 2021 || 83 || align=left | Alt.: 2014 UC185 || 
|- id="2003 UM379" bgcolor=#d6d6d6
| 1 ||  || MBA-O || 18.1 || 1.3 km || multiple || 2003–2019 || 28 Nov 2019 || 28 || align=left | — || 
|- id="2003 UR379" bgcolor=#d6d6d6
| 0 ||  || MBA-O || 17.2 || 2.0 km || multiple || 2003–2021 || 10 Jan 2021 || 40 || align=left | Alt.: 2016 AG138 || 
|- id="2003 US379" bgcolor=#FA8072
| 0 ||  || MCA || 18.78 || data-sort-value="0.52" | 520 m || multiple || 2003–2021 || 26 Nov 2021 || 57 || align=left | Alt.: 2010 RE17 || 
|- id="2003 UW379" bgcolor=#d6d6d6
| 0 ||  || MBA-O || 16.9 || 2.3 km || multiple || 2003–2021 || 18 Jan 2021 || 111 || align=left | Alt.: 2014 WX30 || 
|- id="2003 UZ379" bgcolor=#d6d6d6
| 0 ||  || MBA-O || 16.88 || 2.3 km || multiple || 2003–2021 || 28 Nov 2021 || 73 || align=left | Disc.: SDSSAdded on 17 January 2021Alt.: 2010 BQ98 || 
|}
back to top

References 
 

Lists of unnumbered minor planets